Many significant Japanese historical people of the Sengoku period appear in works of popular culture such as anime, manga, and video games. This article presents information on references to several historical people in such works.

Akechi Mitsuhide
Akechi Mitsuhide is featured in various fictional works, mostly as a villain.
He is the protagonist of 2020 NHK taiga drama Kirin ga Kuru, portrayed by Hiroki Hasegawa.
He is featured in Capcom's Onimusha as Samanosuke Akechi's uncle/relative, as well as Onimusha Tactics, as a playable character.
Mitsuhide is also one of the playable characters in Koei's Samurai Warriors series. He wields a katana, obviously taking techniques from the sword school of Iaido, and is portrayed to have a very close relationship with Mori Ranmaru. He goes against Oda Nobunaga but lets him live in one story. In another story, he is forced to kill Oda Nobunaga and Mori Ranmaru. In the second installment of the series, the relationship with Ranmaru is not present; instead he becomes closer to Nobunaga (and takes longer to fall out with Nobunaga) to a point where he does not want to kill him. This caused Saika Magoichi to assassinate Nobunaga from afar, leaving Mitsuhide to be blamed. Akechi Mitsuhide somehow defeats the Toyotomi and the Saika, uniting the land in Nobunaga's name. In a special side story, he has to fight off and defeat the Tokugawa and the rest of Japan. He also appears in the Warriors Orochi spin-off series as a starting character in the "Samurai"/"Sengoku" story lines. In this game, he shows no intention of killing or betraying Oda Nobunaga and follows him faithfully; in fairness, this depiction is based on the Samurai Warriors 2 incarnation. In Warriors Orochi 2, he and Hosokawa Gracia, his daughter, are rescued by Xing Cai and Inahime. They become allies of Shu, and they tell Liu Bei of Taira Kiyomori and Sun Wukong. He has a dream mode stage where he teams up with Ling Tong and Yue Ying to battle Masamune Date. He is also in the spinoff of Samurai Warriors called Samurai Warriors Katana.
He is featured as a playable character in Sengoku Basara, where he is portrayed as a sadistic psychopath who wields dual scythes, and enjoys killing his opponents. His counterpart in Devil Kings is known as the "Reaper". He appears in Sengoku Basara 3 in a new costume as well as a mask concealing his mouth, under a new name of "Tenkai".
Mitsuhide plays a part in Konami's video game Demon Chaos.
In Eiji Yoshikawa's novel Taiko ki (released in English as Taiko: An Epic Novel of War and Glory in Feudal Japan), Mitsuhide is emotionally abused by Nobunaga, who calls him by the nickname "kumquat head".
In Koei's video game Kessen III, he is portrayed as an ally turned main villain through the game; this is because Oda Nobunaga is portrayed as the hero and unifier of Japan.
In Hikaru no Go, a character named Yuki Mitani plays Mitsuhide in a school play.
In the manga series Tenjho Tenge, the character Sōhaku Kago initially went by the name Akechi Mitsuhide, and killed Oda Nobunaga by decapitation. He then faked his death and became the High Buddhist priest called Tenkai, manipulating the Tokugawa from within.
In the James Clavell historical novel Shōgun, the character of "Akechi Jinsai" is a pastiche of Mitsuhide.
Akechi Mitsuhide is one of few captains who have non-generic faces in the eroge Sengoku Rance. He can be replaced with his daughter Hosokawa Gracia, after doing two of his events using Rance's satisfaction points.
In the anime series Sengoku Otome: Momoiro Paradox, Mitsuhide is portrayed as a gender-switched version of himself, played by Eri Kitamura.
In the anime series The Ambition of Oda Nobuna, Mitsuhide is portrayed as a female protagonist serving Oda Nobuna.
In Drifters, he appears as a member of the Ends voiced by Sho Hayami.
In the Custom Game Mode of Warcraft III The Frozen Throne, One of the Selectable Heroes from the Orc Faction, is a Blade Master, with Various Names. Among the Numerous Blade Master Names was "Jubei", in Reference to this Samurai Warrior.
In Pokémon Conquest Mitsuhide appears as a warlord, with Lapras as his partner and later Articuno.
Mitsuhide is a playable character in the social romance sim Samurai Love Ballad (天下統一恋の乱 Love Ballad) produced by Voltage (company).
Mitsuhide is a playable character in the visual novel game (purchasable through Apple and Samsung) Ikemen Sengoku; Romances Across Time, produced by Cybird (company).  He is voiced by Shunsuke Takeuchi.
In the manga series Hyouge Mono, Mitsuhide is portrayed as a sympathetic and tragic character.
In Oda Cinnamon Nobunaga, Mitsuhide is reincarnated in modern-day Japan as a chipmunk nicknamed "Lis".
In Yasuke, he is depicted largely negatively, as the protagonist was a loyal retainer to Oda Nobunaga.
In the visual novel game and anime series Sengoku Night Blood, Mitsuhide is featured as a playable character, where he is portrayed as a vampire, who is a kind, gentlemanly thinker in the Oda army, and mainly serves as an information relayer and reporter to Oda Nobunaga.  He is voiced by Nobunaga Shimazaki.
He appears as an antagonist briefly in Nioh 2 before changing his name to Tenkei and becoming a supporting character after betraying Oda Nobunaga during the Honnō-ji Incident, where Nobunaga dies. 
He also appears as a supporting character in Nioh where his original identity is unknown until late in the game. His guardian spirit his a half tortoise-half snake spirit, representing balance of light and darkness.
He appears as a non-playable character in Fate/Grand Order as a Caster-class Servant, especially in the GUDAGUDA events. He expresses extreme hate against Toyotomi Hideyoshi.

Azai Nagamasa
Azai Nagamasa makes appearances as a general in the Main Campaign and in various historical battles and historical campaigns in the strategy game Shogun Total War.
Nagamasa is a featured playable character within the video game series Samurai Warriors, in which he is depicted as an extremely honorable man who will stop at nothing to ensure that his notions of justice are enforced. As like in history, Nagamasa decides to collaborate with his erstwhile allies, the Asakura, and fight against Nobunaga at Anegawa; he also expresses a more dramatized showing of love towards his respective wife, Oichi, and cares deeply for her welfare. In appearance, Nagamasa is depicted with his traditional kabuto helmet and carries a lance as his weapon of choice. He is also in the spinoff of Samurai Warriors called Samurai Warriors Katana. This version of the character also appears in the spin-off series Warriors Orochi, as an unlockable character for the Cao Wei storyline. Cao Pi and Mitsunari Ishida attack Nagamasa's forces, including his wife Oichi and Gan Ning of Eastern Wu. Instead of death, as they wanted, Cao Pi enlists the three of them into his army against Orochi. Later, Azai Nagamasa, Oichi, and Gan Ning work with Honda Tadakatsu in repelling Lu Bu and Orochi's forces. In WO2, Azai Nagamasa, the Asakura, and Oichi arrive as reinforcements for Jiang Wei and Maeda Toshiie. In Dream Mode, he works with Naoe Kanetsugu, Sanada Yukimura, and Ma Chao in rescuing peasants from Taira Kiyomori.
Nagamasa is a non-player character in Sengoku Basara 2, along with Oichi, but becomes playable in the expansion Sengoku Basara 2: Heroes. He wields a long sword and carries a shield with him. He is portrayed as a justice-loving man and his army is just like him.
In the anime version of Sengoku Basara, Nagamasa is killed by Mitsuhide Akechi's arquebus corps shoots through him to kill Masamune Date.
Nagamasa are two of the captains who have generic faces in the eroge Sengoku Rance (where they take the names "Azai Nagamasa" and "Asai Nagamasa").
Nagamasa is a boss in the game Nioh 2 as he grows jealous of his brother-in-law, Oda Nobunaga and betrays him after becoming corrupted by using the Spirit Stones (Amrita). His boss form is human with bird-like wings and uses a sword and the water element. His guardian spirit is a two-headed bird.

Chōsokabe Motochika
Motochika is a playable character from Samurai Warriors 2 Xtreme Legends onwards, where he wields a shamisen and sports a Glam rock-inspired appearance, which leads him to continuously call himself as "The Bat King", due to Nobunaga historically referring to him as a "the bat who refuses to fly away from its home". He joins the Toyotomi to keep Shikoku safe, but his son is killed by Shimazu Yoshihiro at Kyushu. Surprisingly, he forgives Yoshihiro. In his ending, Motochika, living longer than he was supposed to be in history, unites Tachibana Ginchiyo, Yoshihiro, and Ishida Mitsunari defeat the Tokugawa at Sekigahara. In Warriors Orochi 2, he finds a resting place in Wu. He works with Sun Quan, Sun Ce, Da Qiao, and Minamoto Yoshitsune in flooding out the battlefield and repelling Taira Kiyomori and Lu Bu. At Chi Bi, the final battle for Wu, he teams up with Wu and Lu Bu in defeating Maeda Keiji, Orochi X, and Da Ji. In Dream Mode, he works with Diao Chan and Zhang He in convincing Lu Bu to turn traitor and repel Da Ji's forces at Osaka Bay. Before the release of Xtreme Legends, Motochika appears as an infamous general in Samurai Warriors 2 and Samurai Warriors 2 Empires.
In Total War: Shogun 2, he is the daimyō of the Chōsokabe Clan.
Motochika appears in the anime and video games Sengoku Basara as a sea-faring Pirate and is loved by his crew, who calls him "Aniki" (Big Brother). His ability was fire-based and armed himself with a ship anchor spear fastened with a chain.
He is a playable character in Pokémon Conquest (Pokémon + Nobunaga's Ambition in Japan), with his partner Pokémon being Dewott and later Samurott.

Date Masamune
The Helmet of Date Masamune was an inspiration for the costume of Darth Vader of the Star Wars trilogy.
Date Masamune has been featured in several video games including Koei's video game Kessen series (where he is a relatively minor officer), and Inindo: Way of the Ninja as the daimyō of the Rikuchu province.
In Samurai Warriors, he is depicted as a young and hot-headed ruler who is chaotically interrupting the battles of other warlords, usually attacking multiple armies at once. His weapon in the first game is a pair of bokken. In the second game, he now looks a little older, though still with the iconic crescent-moon helmet, with his weapons changed to a western-style sabre and a pair of pistols. He frequently expressed ambitions to explore the world beyond Japan, and acquire new, foreign technologies. In the first game, Date's childhood name, "Bontenmaru" is the name of one set of his weapons. In the third game, Masamune has been aged even further, with longer hair and a more stylish costume. In this expansion, he has more of a friendship with Saika Magoichi and Naoe Kanetsugu, and still expresses his desire to explore the world beyond Japan. Masamune also appears in the related series Warriors Orochi, where he is an officer for Orochi's forces, but is unlockable in the 5th Gaiden for Shu Han. With the help of Xing Cai and Zhu Rong, Magoichi Saiga defeats Masamune, and convinces him to join Shu's quest to save Liu Bei. In the sequel, however, he returns as a permanent member of Orochi's forces. He also has a dream mode stage, where he teams up with Sima Yi and Mitsunari Ishida.
In the manga series Samurai Deeper Kyo, Date Masamune (referred to in the series by his childhood name, Bontenmaru) is a member of the Shiseiten and former follower/rival of the main character Kyo. In the series, he is depicted as a tall, muscular, and physically imposing man with a heart of gold. Like his historical version, he wields a wooden sword as his primary weapon and can perform incredible feats of swordsplay with it, but is an even stronger fighter when unarmed. As a member of the Shiseiten, he goes by the name "Bontenmaru".
In the anime series Yoroiden Samurai Troopers, the character Date Seiji is a descendant of Date Masamune. Seiji wears his hair covering one eye, and is at one point asked by Hashiba Touma if he does so because he is related to the One-Eyed Dragon.
Capcom's highly successful hack-&-slash series Sengoku Basara, includes Date Masamune as one of the main characters. In Basara, a distinguishing trait of Date Masamune is his usage of Japanese-style English, or Engrish. Masamune is portrayed as a brazen young lord bent on having fun while conquering the country, dressed in blue and black with a tsuba as an eyepatch over his right eye as well as the historically accurate golden arc on his kabuto. He is also known in-game by his nickname, the One-Eyed Dragon (Dokuganryu). He is also depicted in a constant rivalry relationship with Sanada Yukimura, although there is no clear historical record to suggest such a relationship ever existed. He was shown having 6 Katanas which he uses simultaneously.
Masamune also appears in the strategy game Shogun: Total War as a general in the Uesugi army but not until later in the game (around 1580). He also appears as the leader of the Date Clan in the Samurai Warlords Mod (aka the Shogun Mod) for Medieval Total War.
He is also one of the Leaders (a class of Samurai) in Throne of Darkness.
Date Masamune was also the main subject of the Japanese network NHK's taiga drama Dokuganryū Masamune (One-eyed Dragon, Masamune) in 1987, starring Ken Watanabe as Masumune. To-date, this series is the highest rated NHK Taiga drama.
In the Thomas Harris's novel Hannibal Rising, Hannibal Lecter's aunt, Lady Murasaki, is said to be a descendant of Date Masamune. It is one of Masamune's swords that Lecter uses to commit his first murder by killing a butcher named Paul Momund for insulting Lady Murasaki because she is Japanese.
In Age of Empires III: The Asian Dynasties, Daimyō Date Masamune is available as a daimyō unit. In the game, he is available with Shogunate wonder, only for Japanese civilization. Daimyōs can receive shipments and train troops, while they are a powerful hand cavalry unit. They also provide an attack boost to nearby troops.
In the eroge Sengoku Rance, the youkai king of Oushuu is Dokuganryuu Masamune. "Dokuganryuu" is "One-Eyed style" and also the nickname of Date Masamune, "One-Eyed Dragon".
Masamune also makes an appearance in several smaller manga series such as Brave 10 and Neo Dragoon, as he is a popular figure within Japanese history and culture.
Date Masamune also appears in Sengoku Otome: Momoiro Paradox as a gender-switched version of his real-life self
A hat similar to the Kabuto worn by Date Masamune is obtainable in Team Fortress 2, called the "Samur-Eye". It is wearable by the Demoman, who is also missing an eye.
In the recent video-game spin-off anime series, Sengoku Paradise Kiwami, Date Masamune is dressed in purple outfit instead of blue.
In the Young Samurai book series the ninja Dokuganryu is based on Date Masamune.
In the manga Oda Cinnamon Nobunaga, Masamune is reincarnated in modern-day Japan as a French bulldog named "Boo".
His voice actor, Kakihara Tetsuya also sang the opening song 「リターン乱世独眼竜」 "Ritān Ransei Dokuganryuu", which is related to his nickname 'Dokuganryuu'.
Professional wrestler DJ Nira wrestled as Masamune for the Dramatic Dream Team promotion on February 10, 2013.
He is a playable character in Pokémon Conquest (Pokémon + Nobunaga's Ambition in Japan), with his partner Pokémon being Rufflet and later Braviary.His Warrior skill, One-Eyed Dragon, refers to his historical nickname.
In Nioh, Masamune is a central antagonist of the first DLC expansion, Dragon of the North. He becomes an ally to the player in the other DLCs, Defiant Honor and Bloodshed's End. He uses dual swords, along with wind and water elements. His 2 guardian spirits are a one-eyed dragon and a fish-human hybrid.
Masamune is a playable character in the social romance sim Samurai Love Ballad (天下統一恋の乱 Love Ballad) produced by Voltage (company).
Masamune is a playable character in the visual novel game (purchasable through Apple and Samsung) Ikemen Sengoku; Romances Across Time, produced by Cybird.

Honda Tadakatsu
Honda Tadakatsu appears in numerous Japanese jidaigeki that show the rise of the Tokugawa to power. He is a minor role in Akira Kurosawa's movie Kagemusha.
Honda Tadakatsu also appears in the video games Kessen and in the Samurai Warriors series, in which he is in almost every way the equivalent of Lu Bu of the Dynasty Warriors series: extremely powerful, with his own theme music which plays when he is engaged in battle by the player character, and in any series trying to fight him alone usually results in death, unless playing as a character that is on par with him, such as Yukimura, Keiji, or Musashi; even then, he could very well defeat an opponent easily.
In Onimusha 3, he is one of Akechi Samanousuke's allies in defeating Oda Nobunaga.
In Sengoku Basara, he appears to be part machine and wield a giant drill. An unspeaking giant, Tadakatsu moves by way of jet packs in his armor, and is extremely hard to defeat.
In Samurai Warriors Xtreme Legends and Samurai Warriors 2, he works with Tokugawa Ieyasu to unite the land. In one ending in Xtreme Legends, he kills Maeda Keiji. He is also in the spinoff game Samurai Warriors Katana. In Warriors Orochi, he is one of the resistance leaders against Orochi. In WO2, he is reunited as a starter character with his daughter, Inahime, and his lord, Tokugawa Ieyasu. He works with Zhang Fei in repelling Lu Bu's forces at Nagashino. He and Zhang Fei give Inahime and Xing Cai, their daughters, advice, and they see them go off to find information on Taira Kiyomori. In Dream Mode, he has two stories. In one, he fights alongside Maeda Keiji and Lu Bu. In another, he works with Zhang Fei, Miyamoto Musashi, and Inahime in rescuing Xing Cai and Tokugawa Ieyasu from the Toyotomi at Hinokawa.
Honda Tadakatsu is one of the five raccoon dog captains of the Tokugawa clan ruled by Tokugawa Ieyasu, the raccoon dog youkai, in the eroge Sengoku Rance.
He is a playable character in Pokémon Conquest (Pokémon + Nobunaga's Ambition in Japan), with his partner Pokémon being Metagross and later Dialga.
Tadakatsu appears as a minor character in the social romance sim Samurai Love Ballad (天下統一恋の乱 Love Ballad) produced by Voltage (company).
Tadakatsu appears as a supporting character in Nioh, first fighting William while being infected by Amrita and later aiding his lord in later campaigns. He uses a spear and the earth element. His guardian spirit is a deer.
He also appears in the sequel Nioh 2, once again as a supporting character, a sparring partner for the player in some missions. He uses a spear and the lightning element, with his guardian spirit remaining as a deer.

Hosokawa Gracia
As a samurai wife or other invented roles, Hosokawa Gracia frequently appears as a character in Japanese historical fiction, both novels and drama. One website lists her as a character in over 40 stage dramas, movies, TV dramas (etc.) from 1887 to 2006. She is also frequently referred to in popular writing or talks on the history of the period.
A work that has been translated into English is Ayako Miura's novel, Hosokawa Garasha Fujin (English title: Lady Gracia: a Samurai Wife's Love, Strife and Faith), which follows history fairly closely.
James Clavell used Gracia as the model for the character of Mariko in his novel Shōgun, which was later adapted for television as a miniseries. Elements of Mariko's story follows Gracia's quite closely, although the manner of her death is different and the two characters do not fundamentally have anything in common.
A very heavily fictionalized Gracia also appears in Futaro Yamada's novel Makai Tensho, as a sidekick to Amakusa Shirō Tokisada.
In the video game Kessen, there is a cut-scene depicting Gracia dying heroically because her religion (Christianity) forbade her to commit suicide.
Gracia is her father Akechi Mitsuhide's replacing general in the eroge Sengoku Rance, after doing two of Mitsuhide's events using Rance's satisfaction points.
Gracia is among the playable characters included in Koei's Samurai Warriors 2 Xtreme Legends. Her story mode, which differs greatly from historical events, depicts her having run away from home, eager to learn more about the world. She befriends and tags along with Magoichi Saika. She also wields a pair of bracelets sealed with magical powers, conflicting that she has one of the most powerful musou attacks, despite her low stats. In her ending, Saika Magoichi redeems himself and rescues her from Ishida Mitsunari. In a special side story, she saves many legendary Japanese females from Saika Magoichi. In Warriors Orochi 2, she and her father are rescued by Xing Cai and Inahime. In Dream Mode, she fights alongside Guan Ping and Cao Pi in surpassing their fathers in a test.
She is a playable character in Pokémon Conquest (Pokémon + Nobunaga's Ambition in Japan), with her partner Pokémon being Gothorita and later Gothitelle.

Imagawa Yoshimoto
As a young man, Imagawa Yoshimoto is a playable character in the Koei action game Samurai Warriors: Xtreme Legends, as well as in Kessen III, an action-strategy game. Both games depict Imagawa as a childish dandy, although Samurai Warriors takes this to an extreme by giving him a kemari (a Japanese kickball), which he uses as a weapon (though he used a generic sword in the original Samurai Warriors game). In his story mode ending, Yoshimoto miraculously manages to defeat both Takeda Shingen and Oda Nobunaga in Kyoto, and then plays kemari to his heart's content in front of the other warlords, who look on in amusement and disgust.
In Samurai Warriors 2 however, due to time constraints (as well as an overall shift away from Nobunaga's life towards the post-Nobunaga years), the Battle of Okehazama was shown as part of Nobunaga, Noh, and Mitsuhide's intro movies, and Yoshimoto was only mentioned and shown impaled to death within his palanquin by Nobunaga's spearmen.
However, in Samurai Warriors 2: Xtreme Legends, the battle was brought back, and Yoshimoto himself is given an updated appearance and additional moves as well as a new story mode that tells about his quest for somebody to play kemari with him due to his extreme loneliness. 
He is once again made a free mode only character for Samurai Warriors 3. He is also in the spinoff of Samurai Warriors called Samurai Warriors Katana.
In Warriors Orochi, he is found (using his Samurai Warriors model) retreating from the burning Wan Castle but, is rescued by the Tokugawa and escapes. Later, he becomes part of the Resistance against Orochi aiding Takeda Shingen and Uesugi Kenshin but, ends up supporting Wei after being defeated by them in the Saika Territory. Days later he had been ordered by Cao Pi to give Lu Meng aid at Osaka Bay. In Warriors Orochi 2 Imagawa (using his Samurai Warriors 2: Xtreme Legends model) joins Liu Bei. In Dream Mode, he works with Xing Cai and Tachibana Ginchiyo in rescuing their allies at Chen Cang Castle.
Yoshimoto is also featured as an unplayable character in the Japanese video game Sengoku Basara, as well as the sequel (he becomes playable in Sengoku Basara 2: Heroes). In the anime, he was portrayed as a coward, weak and a pathetic leader that uses his men as scapegoats to save himself, but he was killed by Oda Nobunaga.
In the translation of Path of the Assassin, a Dark Horse Comics translation of Hanzo no Mon, which focuses on Tokugawa Ieyasu and Hattori Hanzō's perspectives, Yoshimoto is viewed more positively (perhaps ironically, compared to Nobunaga) and even decides during the Okehazama campaign to replace Ujizane with Ieyasu (then Matsudaira Motoyasu) as his heir, though dying before doing so.
Imagawa Yoshimoto is the Hanny's king who rules a province full of hannys in the eroge Sengoku Rance.
He also appears briefly in the short manga Kacchu no Senshi Gamu by Yoshihiro Takahashi.
Yoshimoto appears as a gender-switched character in Sengoku Otome: Momoiro Paradox.
In Sengoku Basara, he was portrayed as a coward general that attacks with puny force, retreating further and using his subordinates as decoys by raising them as the same rank. He is also shown with facial make-up, carrying a folded fan and moves like a kabuki.
He is a playable character in Pokémon Conquest (Pokémon + Nobunaga's Ambition in Japan), with his partner Pokémon being Pineco and later Forretress. He was portrayed as an innocent dandy who likes the game Pokémari, which is based on kemari.
He is a non-playable character in Inazuma Eleven GO 2: Chrono Stone.
In Oda Cinnamon Nobunaga, Yoshimoto is reincarnated in modern-day Japan as a Dachshund nicknamed "Gilbert".
Yoshimoto is a playable character in the Japanese version of the visual novel game (purchasable through Apple and Samsung) Ikemen Sengoku; Romances Across Time, produced by Cybird (company). He has been added to the English version but is as yet not playable.
He appears as a boss in Nioh 2 as the first human boss due to the player helping Oda Nobunaga in his campaign to unite Japan. He uses a naginata and dual swords, along with the lightning element. He spirit guardian takes the form of six-tusked elephant.

Ishida Mitsunari
The story of James Clavell's novel Shōgun is based on the strife between Ishida Mitsunari (called Ishido in the novel) and Tokugawa (Toranaga) over the Taiko's son, Toyotomi Hideyori.
He was portrayed by Hiro Kanagawa in the 2008 BBC docudrama Heroes and Villains, centering on the Battle of Sekigahara.
Mitsunari also appears as one of the main characters of Koei's Kessen. He is the first of three commanders under the Toyotomi forces depicted opposing Tokugawa Ieyasu. Whether or not he survives the Battle of Sekigahara and defeats Ieyasu depends on the Player's actions.
Mitsunari is a villain in Age of Empires III: The Asian Dynasties campaign. In the Japanese campaign, players must kill him in order to win and unify Japan.
He appears in Koei's Samurai Warriors 2, as a cold and sarcastic man who, despite his devotion to his lord Toyotomi Hideyoshi, alienates many of his peers with his attitude. He wins the battle of Sekigahara in his ending, but is shown to disappear in many other stories. He also appears in the sequel with an updated character design and a closer friendship to Kato Kiyomasa, and in the spin-off series, Samurai Warriors Katana.
In Capcom's Onimusha: Dawn of Dreams, Mitsunari is the host of the Genma Cladius and serves as a major antagonist for most of the game.
Mitsunari is the lead character in Koei's DS game Saihai no Yukue.
In the Japanese eroge Sengoku Hime, the character "Ishida Futanari" is a parody of Ishida Mitsunari
Mitsunari appears in Capcom's Sengoku Basara 3, as a man with white hair wielding a katana, able to slash his foes with inhuman speed and uses Iaido. He shows an immense hatred towards Tokugawa Ieyasu for the death of his mentor, Toyotomi Hideyoshi, although in Sengoku Basara: The Last Party, he hates Date Masamune more than Ieyasu, blaming him for his mentor's death.
Mitsunari also appears in the Goemon movie. He is a retainer to Lord Hideyoshi but secretly has his own ambitions to overthrow his master. He was killed at Sekigahara by Goemon which prompts his army to retreat.
In the Strategy game Shogun 2 Total War, he is one of the generals in the Sekigahara Historical Battle
Professional wrestler Danshoku Dino wrestled as Ishida Mitsunari for the Dramatic Dream Team promotion on February 10, 2013.
He is a playable character in Pokémon Conquest (Pokémon + Nobunaga's Ambition in Japan), with his partner Pokémon being Pawniard and later Bisharp. He is straightforward and cold, but is actually a good person and never forgets a favor done for him. He has a friendship with the other two warlords Kiyomasa and Masanori. The trio are depict as pre-teens in the game.
Mitsunari is a playable character in the social romance sim Samurai Love Ballad (天下統一恋の乱 Love Ballad) produced by Voltage (company).
Mitsunari is a playable character in the visual novel game (purchasable through Apple and Samsung) Ikemen Sengoku; Romances Across Time, produced by Cybird (company)
Mitsunari is one of the primary antagonists in Nioh, having allied with Edward Kelley in order to gain power to fend off the Tokugawa forces. He uses a sword and the wind element. His guardian spirit is a fox.

Izumo no Okuni
Unlike her role in history, Izumo no Okuni's appearances in fiction often portray her as a fictional , a capable fighter skilled with weapons and magic.
She is a playable character in Koei's Samurai Warriors series as a fighter using a parasol. As the game portrays her having a flirty personality, she is the cause of competition between Maeda Keiji and Ishikawa Goemon.
In Samurai Warriors 2, she is a special character who is unlocked by clearing the Sugoroku game. She additionally appears in the spin-off series Warriors Orochi as a member of the Sengoku force, where she had developed a closeness with Ling Tong and a friendship with Xiao Qiao. The three join the Wu forces in Warriors Orochi 2. Her dream stage has her enlist the help of Meng Huo and Goemon Ishikawa to assist her in collecting donations for her Izumo shrine. Okuni appears in Samurai Warriors 3, with the same hairstyle as before, with slight enhancements.
In the manga and anime Samurai Deeper Kyo, she is initially a foil for the main character, Mibu Kyoshiro, but later becomes a spy for Oda Nobunaga. However, her true allegiance is shown to be to Onime no Kyo (Demon Eyes Kyo), doing things for Kyo's sake whom she loves.
Okuni is a playable character in the Capcom's video game Onimusha Tactics. She fights with a spear and can use healing magic. She is also mentioned as a close friend to Jubei Yagyu in Onimusha: Dawn of Dreams, where she is described as being a great dancer and fighter. According to the game's comic tie-in "Night of Genesis", she is also a long-standing friend of Tenkai Nankobo.
Okuni also appears as a character in the NHK's drama Musashi; however, in this series she remains a performer and does not have any fighting skills.
Okuni makes a small appearance as a little girl in Ōkami singing about the Water Dragon.
The courtesan and geisha Kiku from James Clavell's novel Shōgun is based on Okuni.
She is a playable character in Pokémon Conquest (Pokémon + Nobunaga's Ambition in Japan), with her partner Pokémon being Larvesta and later Volcarona.
Appears in videogame Nioh 2. Protagonist meets and assists her in two sub missions. Near the end of the game she repays by helping them get in Hideyoshi castle.

Katakura Kojūrō
In series with Date Masamune, Katakura Kojūrō has appeared as a character in fiction. He appeared in the video game Sengoku Basara 2, as second in command to Date Masamune, but is often depicted at times as a swordsman meeting his equal and showing a superior tactical ability to Date, although respecting Masamune's superiority.
Kojuro is the name of Dokuganryuu Masamune's  car in the eroge Sengoku Rance.
Kojurou is often in any series where Date Masamune is present, though he may sometimes be a generic character.
Kojuro is a playable character in the social romance sim Samurai Love Ballad (天下統一恋の乱 Love Ballad) produced by Voltage (company).
Kojuro also makes an appearance in the video game Samurai Warriors 4 as a playable character. He is depicted as a man who helds huge loyalty towards his lord Date Masamune, and the Date clan who will do anything to ensure their survival. Kojuro is depicted as a wise man that acts as a clear voice of reasoning as Masamune's closest advisor, sometimes nullifying the recklessness of his young lord.
He is briefly mentioned in Nioh due to passing away from an illness and leaving behind his son Katakura Shigenaga. He gives Date Masamune his guardian spirit, a fish-man hybrid.

Kobayakawa Hideaki
Kobayakawa Hideaki appears as a unique non-player character in Sengoku Basara 3. He is portrayed as a young, cowardly, glutton and as a result carries a pot and pair of wooden spoons to use as weapons. He is made playable in the upcoming expansion, Sengoku Basara 3:Utage
Portrayed by Louis Ozawa Changchien in the 2008 BBC docudrama series Heroes and Villains.
In Sengoku Basara: The Last Party, he was under Tenkai's clutch. He always likes to cook. He also tricked all generals to go to Sekigahara under guise if Ieyasu Tokugawa's invitation, but discovered by Ieyasu himself and plays along with his plans. He was also last seen falling down in the cauldron.
In Nioh, Hideaki is presented as a vainglorious and cowardly lord who participates in the battle of Sekigahara on the Ishida side, but is later convinced by William to defect to the opposing side. He guardian spirit is a bat.

Komatsuhime
In her role in the video game Samurai Warriors, Komatsuhime goes by her childhood name, Ina. She wields a long bladed bow, and can attack in melee combat and also at range. She is depicted as a proud daughter of Honda Tadakatsu, and that she would make her Lord and her Father proud as well. She also has a strong tomboyish tendency, where she may rather be fighting than be a regular woman. In the first installment, she is friends with Kunoichi. Additionally, in the game, she is charged with one of Hattori Hanzō's accomplishment during Ieyasu's journey in Iga: escorting Anayama Nobukimi, while Hanzo escorts the lord personally. Historically, Hanzō took both tasks at once and succeeded them both. Inahime is in the spinoff of Samurai Warriors called Samurai Warriors Katana on the Nintendo Wii. Ina also appears in the crossover game Warriors Orochi. In it, she befriends Sun Shang Xiang after Orochi blackmails the Tokugawa and the Wu Army into servitude. Although both of them are forced to fight for Orochi against their will, they end up joining the Resistance after Ina convinces Sun Shang Xiang to reunite with her older brother Sun Ce at Sekigahara. In Warriors Orochi 2, Shu is joined by the Tokugawa clan, Hattori Hanzō, Shang Xiang, Honda Tadakatsu, and Inahime. Inahime and Xing Cai become friends, and they rescue Hosokawa Gracia and her father, Akechi Mitsuhide. In Dream Mode, Inahime works with Huang Zhong and Xiahou Yuan in fire ambushing an enemy coalition led by Date Masamune.
She is a playable character as Ina in Pokémon Conquest (Pokémon + Nobunaga's Ambition in Japan), with her partner Pokémon being Prinplup and later Empoleon.

Kuroda Kanbei
In his role in Koei's Samurai Warriors 3 video game, Kuroda Kanbei is chief strategist of Toyotomi Hideyoshi, feared by many for his demonic look. He later goes on to serve Tokugawa Ieyasu. His weapon is a magical orb.
He appears as a playable character in Capcom's Sengoku Basara 3. He appears as a convict with his hands cuffed together and chained to a giant metal ball, which doubles as his weapon. According to the game he was a Lieutenant under the Toyotomi banner, and tried to seize some power form him in a failed coup. He is locked up in the Mines of Ishigakibaru and is often reigned in under Yoshitsugu Otani's control.
In Kessen III he is a playable retainer that serves with Hideyoshi against the Mori.
Kanbei is portrayed by Junichi Okada, a member of V6, in the 2014 NHK taiga drama Gunshi Kanbei.
He is a playable character in Pokémon Conquest (Pokémon + Nobunaga's Ambition in Japan), with his partner Pokémon being Lampent and later Chandelure. His appearance resembles a ghost, probably because to resemble his Lampent.
Kanbei appears as a supporting character, alongside his son Nagamasa, in 2017's Nioh. His guardian spirit is a dragon.
In Oda Cinnamon Nobunaga, Kanbei is reincarnated in modern-day Japan as a Toy Poodle nicknamed "Charlie".
Briefly appears in videogame Nioh 2 as an ally of Tenkai.

Kyōgoku Maria
Kyōgoku Maria, the older sister of Azai Nagamasa, is depicted in Capcom's Sengoku Basara 4 video game as a sorceress with the ability to manipulate her sleeves in combat and uses her charm to deceive enemies.
 She appears in Koei's Samurai Warriors 4: Empires as a unique NPC that can be playable if selected. However, she is not considered as a true playable character, due to being assigned with edit character parts and weapons.

Maeda Matsu
Matsu is depicted in Capcom's Sengoku Basara video game series as a woman who wields a naginata as her respective weapon, able to summon animal familiars, and possesses a significantly close relationship with her husband, Toshiie.
Matsu had also been featured within a TV drama shown by NHK called Toshiie to Matsu, depicting her relations with Toshiie, and thus making her a primary figure of romantic fame.
Although not a real playable character, Matsu is also a bodyguard in Koei's Samurai Warriors 2 under the "Lady Samurai" class.

Maeda Toshiie
Maeda Toshiie appears as a playable character in Samurai Warriors 2: Xtreme Legends, in which he is depicted as an apprentice to Shibata Katsuie and a man that would sacrifice himself in the name of a warrior, one of the common romanticizations that Koei regularly use to individualize their characters. He wields a serrated sword, accompanied by two spears. In his ending, he sees Shibata Katsuiie die in a flaming castle with Oichi, and he takes his wrath out on Toyotomi Hideyoshi. In Warriors Orochi 2, he and Saika Magoichi are rescued by Xiahou Yuan. He later works with Jiang Wei, the Azai, and the Asakura in capturing Da Ji. In Dream Mode, he works with Pang De, Shibata Katsuiie, and Sun Ce in defeating Da Ji and Himiko.
His Sengoku Basara portrayal implies that he serves the Oda clan off screen, but confirmed served the Toyotomi clan to repent for their shortcomings. But his story mode depicts him as a dysfunctional family man, in which he has a close relationship with his wife Matsu and their "nephew" Keiji, where the first two-story modes tell on their unusual methods to support one another. He also uses fire-based techniques and summoning animals. His body scars bore brunt of his battles with the wild animals.
The 2002 NHK taiga drama Toshiie to Matsu (利家とまつ～加賀百万石物語～) was based on the story of their lives together. Maeda Toshiie was played by Toshiaki Karasawa, and Matsu by Nanako Matsushima. Karasawa later made a special appearance as the same character in the 2006 NHK Taiga drama Komyo ga Tsuji (功名が辻) (episodes 39 and 40).
Maeda Toshiie is one of the few captains who have non-generic faces in the eroge Sengoku Rance. He can transform to Maeda Keiji after doing two of his events using Rance's satisfaction points.
Maeda Toshiie (Inuchiyo) is a playable character in the social romance sim Samurai Love Ballad (天下統一恋の乱 Love Ballad) produced by Voltage (company).

Maeda Toshimasu
Toshimasu (often depicted under the name of Keiji or Keijirō) is often portrayed as somewhat of a prankster and is often dubbed crazy, or kabukimono, by others for his wild ways. Sampling this where it was shown/mentioned in a few video games that he filled his uncle's (Toshiie)'s bath with cold water, a feat the historical man was well known for.
He is a playable character in the Samurai Warriors series and is usually one of the strongest enemies to defeat. His weapon is a two-pronged spear, similar to a sasumata. He also appears in Warriors Orochi on the Orochi Army, later serving the Wu Army as a Gaiden character.
Maeda Keiji debuted as a playable character in Sengoku Basara 2. This version of the character wields a giant Ōdachi and has a pet monkey named Yumekichi. He is old friends with Toyotomi Hideyoshi, and helps defeat the man in his ending. He appears in Sengoku Basara 3 as the representative of both the Uesugi and Maeda clans. On game, if you fight him, his men appear to be partying, stopped when a giant person sounds the alarm.
Keijiro also appears in Onimusha Blade Warriors as well as the first Onimusha game, under the name: Yumemaru (a little boy that Princess Yuki takes care of).
Maeda Keiji is also a secret playable character in Kessen III through loading a Samurai Warriors data file from the memory card.
A manga series loosely based on Keiji's life illustrated by Tetsuo Hara (of Fist of the North Star fame) was produced titled Keiji.
In the NHK television drama series Toshiie to Matsu, Maeda Keijiro is depicted by the actor Mitsuhiro Oikawa.
Maeda Keiji is Maeda Toshiie's transformation in the eroge Sengoku Rance after doing two of Toshiie's events using Rance's satisfaction points.
Maeda Keiji appears as a minor character in the social romance sim Samurai Love Ballad (天下統一恋の乱 Love Ballad) produced by Voltage (company).

Additionally, Keiji's famed horse, Matsukaze, appears in a number of games and movies as well.
Matsukaze is a ridable horse in the Samurai Warriors and Warriors Orochi game series.
The jetbike Keiji rides in the Vasara game series is said to be the model "Matsukaze 1000".

Matsunaga Hisahide
Matsunaga Hisahide is featured as a character in Sengoku Basara 2: Heroes, in which he is depicted as a man of treachery who enjoys any course of action that would subsequently present to him a greater sum of pleasure. He takes a primary role in Katakura Kojūrō's and Maeda Keiji's stories; and by the end of such scenarios he sets aflame his initial base with explosives as a showing of defeat. Hisahide was announced as one of 14 characters to be made playable in the upcoming expansion to Sengoku Basara: Samurai Heroes
He also appears in Samurai Warriors 2 as a purchasable Bodyguard under the "Fire Ninja" class. He later appears in Samurai Warriors 4 as a playable character.
in Sengoku Basara, he also appears during the challenge, involving his mercenaries to destroy 2 gates. Then if you repulsed all attempts, he appears. If failed, he was shown waving his sword as it explodes. He excels in sword fights, mixing it with his fascination in explosives and fire-based techniques.
In Nioh, William can interact with the ghost of Hisahide who refers to himself as Danjo. His guardian spirit is a spider.
He also appears in Nioh 2 as a supporting character where he continues to support the player as Dango due to blowing himself up after betraying Oda Nobunaga and destroying himself, his teapot, and his castle rather than surrendering to Nobunaga. His guardian spirit remains as a spider.
In Oda Cinnamon Nobunaga, Hisahide is reincarnated in modern-day Japan as a Chihuahua nicknamed "Whip".

Miyamoto Musashi

In the Sengoku Basara anime and game, he was shown to be mischievous, using stones, oar and wooden sword to fight.
He also appears in Samurai Warriors 2 as a rival of Sasaki Kojirō and wields two Daishōs.
He appears as a female Saber/Berserker class servant in the game Fate/Grand Order.
He appears in Nioh as a supporting character in a couple of missions. In game he is still a young samurai who is practicing his swordsmanship on yõkai.

Mōri Motonari
He (along with King Lear) was the basis of Hidetora Ichimonji in the Akira Kurosawa film Ran.
Motonari has also made an appearance in video games such as that of Capcom's Sengoku Basara 2 initially as a playable character who is relatively inconsiderate to his subordinates, abandoning them if they are below his standards and employing other means that can be deemed cruel. Motonari wields a large wheel as his weapon, which possesses an outer-layer of blades. He is the only character who can inflict damage on his own men in combat.
Motonari also appears in Samurai Warriors 3, wielding a crossbow mounted to his arm. He comes out of retirement to help Japan fight off the threat of Oda Nobunaga.
Motonari is the main protagonist of the NHK 36th drama Motonari.
Motonari is one of the lords in the eroge Sengoku Rance. He has been cursed by a yōkai named Daidaara, the player can ask for Sakamoto Ryouma's information after recruiting her to lift his curse. His three daughters' names: Mōri Teru, Kikkawa Kiku and Kobayakawa Chinu are based on historical Motonari's three sons: Mōri Takamoto, Kikkawa Motoharu, and Kobayakawa Takakage.
The board game Shogun features Mōri Motonari as one of the daimyōs to choose.
Motonari also appears in the strategy game Pokémon Conquest, where he is become the warlord of the Ransei Region's Greenleaf Nation and he will be accompanied by a Snivy, who may evolve into a Servine.
In the video game League of Legends Yorick Mōri has characteristics that are references to Mōri Motonari.

Mori Ranmaru
Ranmaru has appeared as a character in fiction and has appeared in several video games (such as Sengoku Basara, Onimusha, Kessen III and the Samurai Warriors series) in which he is usually portrayed as having a feminine to an androgynous appearance, in which leads to usual confusion of his gender by some of the other characters. He is also depicted as truly loyal to Oda Nobunaga, who in return praises Ranmaru for his skills (and possibly his beauty) in battle.
Ranmaru is depicted greatly in Samurai Warriors as Nobunaga's most loyal bodyguard, where he wields a nodachi. Differentiating all the other portrayals was seen in the first Samurai Warriors, where he also has a close friendship with Akechi Mitsuhide, who at the time planned to assassinate Nobunaga, leaving Ranmaru in a state of confusion on which path he will follow. In Samurai Warriors 2, Ranmaru has no storyline, but is seen in some cutscenes and cinema cameos and is a special character unlocked by completing the first two Ranmaru's and Mitsuhide's requests in Survival Mode. He is also in the spinoff Samurai Warriors Katana, where he helps the player to find and rescue Oda Nobunaga at Honnouji, temporary replacing Hideyoshi as the player's guide in this stage. He also appears in Warriors Orochi as fighting for the Resistance Army alongside Ma Chao in Mt. Ding Jun. Sun Ce of the Orochi Army later on captures Ranmaru after a duel, yet was set free due to Sun Ce feeling some comfort fighting him. From then on, Ranmaru joins Sun Wu to understand more about the Sun Family's unbreakable bonds and is still serving them in the game's sequel. Though from his Dream Mode in Warriors Orochi 2 along with Zhou Tai and Dian Wei, it can be stated that Ranmaru is still on full alert to protect Nobunaga.
Sengoku Basara portrays a different appearance for Ranmaru as a young, boyish, and eager archer in his early teens who seeks recognition from Nobunaga. He is apparently the most childish in all his portrayals, seeking only Kompeitō as a reward from his master in his endings. He also armed with a bow, with a deadly accuracy, but only rewarded with candies.
The eroge Sengoku Rance portrays him as a girl, Ranmaru. She is one of the loyal retainers of Oda Nobunaga. She is in love with Shibata Katsuie, also Oda's retainer.
The character Ranmaru Morii's name in Perfect Girl Evolution is a nod to the historical Ranmaru.
Mori Ranmaru is one of the main characters in a manga oneshot by Inui Miku, Akatsuki no Fumi, where he is portrayed with slightly feminine features.
Akihiro Hino has stated that the character Kirino Ranmaru in Inazuma Eleven GO was based on Mori Ranmaru.
The anime Nobunaga the Fool portrays Ranmaru as a secret identity that's given to the character Jeanne Kaguya d'Arc by Nobunaga
A female version of Ranmaru appears in Gaim's portion of Kamen Rider x Kamen Rider Gaim & Wizard: The Fateful Sengoku Movie Battle. She is an attendant who served under Nobunaga and the OOO Army and when both Nobunaga and Bujin OOO fall to the hands of Bujin Gaim, she is forced to escape with Kaito Kumon/Armored Rider Baron. Later on, she is saved by bandits by Kaito and she makes him the new lord of the OOO Army which is renamed the Baron Army and recruits remnants of armies who were defeated by Bujin Gaim. She accompanies him to Ieyasu castle where the final battle takes place. She is last seen celebrating the defeat of Bujin Gaim which causes the return of rain to her world. She is portrayed by Mao Ueda.
He is a playable character in Pokémon Conquest (Pokémon + Nobunaga's Ambition in Japan), with his partner Pokémon being Riolu and later Lucario. He also portrayed as having a feminine appearance in the game. In his own storyline, he join the beauty contest held in the Ransei region due to being mistaken for a girl. He is shown as extremely loyal to Nobunaga too.
Ranmaru appears as a minor character in the social romance sim Samurai Love Ballad (天下統一恋の乱 Love Ballad) produced by Voltage (company).
Ranmaru appears in the Netflix ONA series Yasuke as a retainer, and implied lover, of Oda Nobunaga.
In the light novel, Honnouji kara Hajimeru Nobunaga to no Tenka Touitsu, the protagonist Makoto Kurosaka after being time slipped to the Sengoku period and saving Nobunaga's life during the Honnouji Incident, Makoto have changed history including the fate of Mori Ranmaru and his brothers, Bomaru and Rikimaru where they survived the Honnouji incident. Ranmaru remained an acquaintance of Makoto, whereas his brother Rikimaru became a retainer under Makoto.

Naoe Kanetsugu
Naoe Kanetsugu is the star of Yuji Takemura's manga Gifu Dodo Naoe Kanetsugu: Maeda Keiji Tsukigatari (義風堂々 直江兼続 -前田慶次月語り-)
Kanetsugu is the protagonist of the 2009 NHK taiga drama Tenchijin.
Naoe Kanetsugu was featured as a playable character in Samurai Warriors 2, wielding an ornate sword and paper charms, portrayed as originally serving Uesugi Kenshin at the Battles of Kawanakajima and Tedorigawa, then serving Hideyoshi and later the Western Army against Tokugawa Ieyasu, though being concerned with justice and honor primarily. In his own scenario, he wins the Siege of Hasedo with Maeda Keiji's help and along with Uesugi Kagekatsu, and Sanada Yukimura leads an Uesugi-Sanada force against Edo Castle, killing Tokugawa Ieyasu's son Hidetada and later avenging Ishida Mitsunari's death by annihilating the victorious Eastern Army that returns to Edo Castle, ending the Tokugawa Shogunate and along with Yukimura, they vow to create a greater world based on righteousness. He also depicted as having an extremely close friendship with Maeda Keiji, Ishida Mitsunari and Sanada Yukimura. Kanetsugu also appears in Warriors Orochi, a crossover between Samurai Warriors and Dynasty Warriors, usually alongside Kenshin Uesugi.
The female character Naoe Ai from the eroge Sengoku Rance is based on him. She is the strategist of Uesugi Kenshin.
Kanetsugu briefly appeared in the anime television series of Sengoku Basara, only to be defeated by Honda Tadakatsu in a comical fashion.
In Sengoku Basara 2, he appears as a generic officer of the Uesugi army who constantly claims to be invincible. He appears again in Sengoku Basara 3, but has Kanetsugu's trademark helmet with the large kanji "Ai" ("love").
Appearing in a semi-fictional biography as the main protagonist of the historical manga Gifuu doudou Naoe Kanetsugu by Tetsuo Hara.
In KissxSis, he was shown as one of Keita's teacher's fetish, Japanese samurai generals.
He is a playable character in Pokémon Conquest (Pokémon + Nobunaga's Ambition in Japan), with his partner Pokémon being Kadabra and later Alakazam. He appears as a warlord who is warmhearted and dutiful, and honors love and justice very much.
Kanetsugu appears as a minor character in the social romance sim Samurai Love Ballad (天下統一恋の乱 Love Ballad) produced by Voltage (company).

Nene
Nene is a featured playable character within the Samurai Warriors series and acts as an ultimate replacement of Kunoichi. Being the wife of Toyotomi Hideyoshi, Nene respectively acts as his bodyguard and supporter in the persona of a female ninja, with almost the same moves as her predecessor, Kunoichi. Contrasting this is her special skills and her strange motherly personality, in which she refers to everyone (especially to her husband's retainers) as her "children". An example of her motherly personality can be found in one of her cutscenes, where she "lectures" her defeated enemies to make them get to know one another. In her ending, she kicks out Hideyoshi's other wives and concubines and helps Hideyoshi unite Japan. In her special side story, she brings the Toyotomi clan back together at Sekigahara. She is in a spinoff of Samurai Warriors called Samurai Warriors Katana. In Warriors Orochi, she works with Kunoichi against Orochi. Nene later joins Wei. In the sequel, she reunites with Toyotomi Hideyoshi. In Dream Mode, she works with Yuan Shao and Zhu Rong in protecting a castle from falling.
Nene appears in flashbacks in Sengoku Basara 2 in Keiji's story. It's implied that her husband killed her to achieve power. It is revealed later in the second season of the anime for Sengoku Basara, that the one who killed her was her husband Toyotomi Hideyoshi. Because he sought only power and a purging of all weakness, and seeing love as a weakness, he killed her in order to purge himself of it.
Nene is a major character in Eiji Yoshikawa's novel Taiko ki.
She is a playable character in Pokémon Conquest (Pokémon + Nobunaga's Ambition in Japan), with her partner Pokémon being Golbat and Crobat. She has a motherly personality in-game.

Nōhime
Unlike her role in history, Nōhime is usually portrayed as a femme fatale, in line with the traditional villainous portrayal of her husband, Nobunaga Oda.
Her role in Sengoku Basara depicts a beautiful and kind-hearted woman who would stop at nothing to achieve her husband's unity of the land, despite the fact that Nobunaga never cared about her. She wields a pair of guns (Ebony and Ivory from Devil May Cry), but her charge/prime attacks unleash a whole variety of gun weaponry.
In Onimusha 3: Demon Siege she goes by the name of 'Vega Donna' and has been transformed into a demon woman to join her husband.
Samurai Warriors depicts Nōhime as the "Viper's Daughter", a sadist, who wields a pair of retractable claws, adding this is her use of bombs to add range. In the first installment, her relationship with Nobunaga is considered bipolar, in which she is torn between her sexual admiration for him and her desire to kill him for her father's wishes. One of her endings show an attempt of murdering Nobunaga at his moment of weakness, but failed at the moment he wakes up. Samurai Warriors 2 has a less prominent role for Nōhime, as Nobunaga treats her instead like any other retainer but in a sense that she still loves him loyally throughout the game (although one of her lines states that she has "already tamed Nobunaga".) In Samurai Warriors 3, Nōhime's role is still less prominent, but she is alongside her husband in most of his battles. Her sadism is more emphasized here, as even when she is in danger, she expresses enjoyment. As in the first game, she has to make the choice between her loyalty to her father's wishes to kill Nobunaga or stay with her husband. Nonetheless, she assists Nobunaga to exterminate her family thought she feels that she has no purpose in the world afterwards. She attempts to assassinate Nobunaga later on, but retracts herself. Her ending shows her and Nobunaga willingly remain to their death in the burning Honnoji Temple (after Mitsuhide's revolt) while pleasantly accept to live in hell. She is also in a spinoff of Samurai Warriors called Samurai Warriors Katana. In Warriors Orochi, Lu Meng and Taishi Ci rescues her, and she joins Wu. In Warriors Orochi 2, she is reunited with Oda Nobunaga.
A different view of Nōhime is presented in the game Kessen III. Under her childhood name of Kicho, she is presented as a chaste and innocent princess.
Nōhime was portrayed by Japanese actress Miki Nakatani in the 1998 film Oda Nobunaga, and by Haruka Ayase in the 2005 sci-fi film Sengoku Jieitai 1549. Emi Wakui played Nōhime in the 2006 NHK drama Kōmyō ga tsuji.
In the eroge Sengoku Rance, Oda Nobunaga Kazunosuke's deceased wife's name is "Kichou", other popular name of Nouhime.
She appears alongside Oda Nobunaga in the manga Sengoku Strays.
She is a playable character in Pokémon Conquest (Pokémon + Nobunaga's Ambition in Japan), with her partner Pokémon being Misdreavus and Mismagius.
Nohime is an unlockable Stigmata in the 2016 mobile game Honkai Impact 3rd made by miHoYo. 
In Nioh, her soul is transformed by antagonist Edward Kelley into a yuki-onna and is fought as a boss. She uses a naginata and the water element (in the form of ice). Her guardian spirit is a butterfly.
 In Nioh 2, she is met by the protagonist and Tokichiro alongside her husband, Oda Nobunaga. During the burning of Honnoji Temple, she stays with Nobunaga and the two die together. She was told by her father Saito Dosan to kill Nobunaga if he proved to be a fool but she fell in love with him and decided to help in his ambition to unify Japan. Her guardian spirit remains as a butterfly.

Oda Nobunaga
Oda Nobunaga has appeared in a number of works across various media.
Eiji Yoshikawa's historical novel Taiko Ki
Novel and anime series Yōtōden 
Novel The Samurai's Tale by Erik Christian Haugaard. 
James Clavell's novel Shōgun, the character Goroda is a pastiche of Nobunaga. 
In the illustrated novel series Samurai Cat as the boss of the main character Miaowara Tomokato, who goes on a quest of revenge to avenge Nobunaga's death by a group of enemies.
Film and television dramas:
Akira Kurosawa's film Kagemusha (1980), portrayed by Daisuke Ryu.
Nobunaga's life and exploits were the subject of NHK's 30th taiga drama, 信長 Oda Nobunaga (1992), portrayed by Naoto Ogata.
Sengoku Jieitai 1549 (2005), portrayed by Takeshi Kaga. In the film Nobunaga is killed by time-travellers.
Tenchijin (2009), portrayed by Kōji Kikkawa.
Goemon (2009), portrayed by Hashinosuké Nakamura.
Ask This of Rikyu (2013), portrayed by Yusuke Iseya.
Gunshi Kanbei (2014), portrayed by Yōsuke Eguchi.
MAGI Tensho Keno Shonen Shisetsu (2020), portrayed by Kōji Kikkawa.
Anime and manga series:
Drifters
Flame of Recca
Nobunaga Concerto
Samurai Deeper Kyo
Nobunaga no shinobi
Oda Cinnamon Nobunaga, wherein he is reincarnated as a Shiba Inu in modern-day Japan.
Yasuke opens with the battle of Honno-ji, and features Nobunaga heavily in flashbacks.
Manga series:
Tail of the Moon
Kacchu no Senshi Gamu
Tsuji Kunio's historical fiction The Signore: Shogun of the Warring States. 
Nobunaga no Chef
Anime, as a female character:
Sengoku Otome: Momoiro Paradox
Sengoku Collection
The Ambition of Oda Nobuna
In music: Kamenashi Kazuya of the Japanese pop group KAT-TUN wrote and performed a song titled "1582" which is written from the perspective of Mori Ranmaru at the Incident at Honnouji.
The VOCALOID producer Utata-P created a Hatsune Miku song under the title "Not a Dream... Not a Lie... A Happy Scene Before My Eyes" which details a resurrected Oda Nobunaga speaking from a kitten through a girl.
In the eroge Sengoku Rance 
Stage action and anime adaptation of Nobunaga the Fool
Video games:
Kessen III
Ninja Gaiden II
Ninja Master's
Maplestory
Inindo: Way of the Ninja
Atlantica Online
Onimusha
Samurai Warriors. The version of Nobunaga also appears in a crossover with Dynasty Warriors, known as Warriors Orochi
Sengoku Basara (and its anime adaptation) - Described as a literally demonic and heartless general. Uses a sword, shotgun and darkness-based attacks.
As a playable character and the main villain in Pokémon Conquest. 
Nioh as boss in the late game after being revived by Edward Kelley. He uses a sword and all elemental types due to his guardian spirit, a peacock.
Nioh 2 as a supporting character where the player helps him in his campaign to unite Japan. He later dies during the Honnō-ji Incident. He uses a sword and all elemental types. He has 2 guardian spirits, a peacock (from the first game) and a panther.
Soulcalibur
Shogun: Total War
Total War: Shogun 2
Throne of Darkness
Nobunaga's Ambition series
Civilization V 
Age of Empires II: The Conquerors
Inazuma Eleven GO
Payday 2
In the parody manga Koha-Ace, and later the mobile game Fate/Grand Order, Oda Nobunaga is featured as a female Archer, Berserker and Avenger-class Servant.
There are five versions of Nobunaga Oda in Kamen Rider series:
A version of Nobunaga appears in Kamen Rider × Kamen Rider Gaim & Wizard: The Fateful Sengoku Movie Battle. In it, Nobunaga is the Lord of the OOO Army. When Bujin Gaim attacks Honnō-ji with a Greeed Army, Nobunaga awaits inside, contemplating the short life he's had. When he meets Kaito Kumon/Armored Rider Baron, Nobunaga takes a liking to him and realizes that they are both alike as they seek to unite their respective worlds through force. Nobunaga gives Kaito a spare Taka Medal and sacrifices himself to allow Kaito and Ranmaru to escape, dying in the flames with several kaijin. Nobunaga is portrayed by Hiroaki Iwanaga, who previously portrayed Akira Date, the original Kamen Rider Birth and second Kamen Rider Birth Prototype in Kamen Rider OOO.
Nobunaga previously appears in Kamen Rider x Kamen Rider OOO & Double feat. Skull: Movie War Core, although this Nobunaga is revealed to have been a clone with the appearance and memories of the original.
Nobunaga also appears in Kamen Rider Ghost as one of the 15 heroic souls and an alternative form for Kamen Rider Specter.
In Kamen Rider Zi-O, Geiz Myoukoin/Kamen Rider Geiz is actually a time-displaced younger Nobunaga himself, confirmed in Kamen Rider Zi-O the Movie: Over Quartzer. An older Nobunaga also appears in the said movie. In the same movie, there is also a reference to the ancestry of Kamen Rider Drive’s protagonist Krim Steinbelt is a nod to his actor Chris Peppler being one of Mitsuhide Akechi’s descendant.
Nobunaga is a playable character in the social romance sim Samurai Love Ballad (天下統一恋の乱 Love Ballad) produced by Voltage (company).
Nobunaga is a playable character in the visual novel game (purchasable through Apple and Samsung) Ikemen Sengoku; Romances Across Time, produced by Cybird (company).
In Samurai Cats depicted many Sengoku era warriors as cats, Nobunaga is known as Nobunyaga Oda. This version also appears in a crossover Warriors All-Stars

Oichi
Oichi was portrayed by the actress Tanaka Misato in the 41st NHK taiga drama Toshiie to Matsu, broadcast in 2002.
Oichi has also made appearances in the video games Onimusha 2: Samurai's Destiny, Samurai Warriors, Warriors Orochi, and Sengoku Basara 2. She is usually depicted as a beautiful, chaste, and loyal woman. Though her relationship with her brother Nobunaga usually formed into rebellion, due to her romantic involvement with her husband, Asai Nagamasa. She is also known as "Ichi".
She was depicted in Samurai Warriors as a young peppy teen who loves both her brother and her husband to the point that she wants them no longer to fight. She wields a kendama. In Samurai Warriors 2, she matured, and that her relationship with Nobunaga became dissolved due to her more romantic involvement with Nagamasa. She also appears in Samurai Warriors 3 with an updated character design and a new weapon in the form of large, interconnected bladed rings. In the first Samurai Warriors game, she has two endings. One ending allows her to keep both her brother and her husband alive, but in the other ending, she is forced to wipe out her brother's clan and live on the run with her husband. In SW2, she is forced to leave him and kill him, becoming heartbroken, but in Nagamasa's ending, she gets to live with her husband and her brother in happiness. She is in a spinoff of Samurai Warriors called Samurai Warriors Katana. In Warriors Orochi, she, Azai Nagamasa, and Gan Ning are captured by Cao Pi and join Wei. They work with Honda Tadakatsu in repelling Lu Bu and Orochi's forces. In WO2, Oichi, the Asakura clan, and Azai Nagamasa save Jiang Wei and Maeda Toshiie from death. In Dream Mode, she works with Shang Xiang, the Nanman, and Da Qiao in rescuing their husbands from Da Ji in Kyushu.
Sengoku Basara 2's version of Oichi is a gloomy, soft-spoken woman who wields a dual-bladed naginata (where she can also split it into two). She worries constantly for her husband (who seems to be slightly irritated by it), but stops at nothing for a deeper connection was made. As she is the blood sister of Nobunaga, it is implied that she is a witch, with demonic hands and an evil laugh or two appear at moments of low consciousness. She was voiced by Mamiko Noto. In Sengoku Basara 3, she now appears without her naginata, rather having her demonic hands be used as weapons.
The gunner mercenary in Atlantica Online is based on Oichi, referencing her brother's claim to fame by using gunners in the battle of Nagashino.
Oichi was named Oyu in Onimusha 2, in which she works with Yagyu Jubei, Saika Magoichi, Ekei Ankokuji, and Fuma Kotaro in defeating her brother. Oyu is also in Onimusha Blade Warriors.
She is a character in Nobunaga's Ambition, a game series similar to Romance of the Three Kingdoms.
She is a character in Kessen III, in where she looks the closest to her traditional paintings of her.
She is a playable character in Pokémon Conquest (Pokémon + Nobunaga's Ambition in Japan), with her partner Pokémon being Jigglypuff and Wigglytuff. She will help the player during the first story line.
Oichi appears as a minor character in the social romance sim Samurai Love Ballad (天下統一恋の乱 Love Ballad) produced by Voltage (company).
Oichi appears as a minor character in Nioh 2 where she is married to Azai Nagamasa, who dies after being corrupted by the Spirit Stones. She remarries to Shibata Katsuie then commits seppuku after his death from using the Spirit Stones to protect her and her daughter, Yodogimi. Her guardian spirit is a nine-tailed fox.

Ōtani Yoshitsugu
Ōtani Yoshitsugu becomes a playable character in Samurai Warriors 4. His appearance with a white mask was inspired by his iconic exploits at Sekigahara for simple recognition. He is Ishida Mitsunari's loyal friend who sided with him at Sekigahara.
Yoshitsugu has made an appearance as a masked samurai of the Western army in Kessen.
Yoshitsugu is also a character in Koei's video game Saihai no Yukue. He is covered with bandages, due to his leprosy.
Yoshitsugu is a minor character in James Clavell's tale Shogun where he appears as a Leprous Christian Daimyō called Onoshi.
Yoshitsugu is a character in Sengoku Basara 3 who rides a floating chair with orbs as weapons.
He also appeared in Sengoku Basara: The Last Party as Mitsunari's aide and lieutenant, doing anything to achieve Mitsunari's vengeance, alongside Oda Clan's Oichi. He was killed by Nobunaga when he tried to delay the Demon King for Mitsunari to recover. In Justice End, he never forsakes his master Mitsunari until he was defeated by Kojuro.
Yoshitsugi is a secondary antagonist in Nioh, where he introduces Edward Kelley to Mitsunari and during the battle of Sekigahara fuses with his Guardian Spirit to fight William. He uses dual swords and the wind element. His guardian spirit is a butterfly-human hybrid.

Saitō Dōsan
Saitō Dōsan makes an appearance in the eroge Sengoku Hime.
He also appears in the eroge Sengoku Rance as the head of the Saito clan, the girl "Aburako Dousan", after being crushed by the Ashikaga clan and wanders around Mamushi Oil Field, which is a pun about his nickname "". Aburako Dousan can be recruited after recruiting the Mino Three, her retainers, through using Rance's satisfaction points. The "Mino Triumvirate", Saito's chief vassals, were made into the game, with Inaba's name changed to "Ganko Ittetsu", Andou to "Andou Kyuuri", and Ujiie to "Takuwan-sama".
Dōsan appears as a supporting character in Nioh 2. He is also revealed to be the protagonist's father. He recognizes the protagonist as his son but does not tell him prior to his death. His guardian spirit is a white viper.

Ōtomo Sōrin
Ōtomo Sōrin appears in Sengoku Basara 3 as a non-player character and is playable in later games. He is a young man who leads a religious cult devoted to Xavi.

Sanada Masayuki
Sanada Masayuki is a major character in the 2005 movie Azumi 2: Death or Love.
Masayuki, played by Masao Kusakari, is also a major character in the 55th NHK Taiga Drama Sanada Maru.
He is also a non-playable character in the Samurai Warriors and Warriors Orochi video game series. He later becomes playable character in Samurai Warriors: Spirit of Sanada.
He also appears as a playable unit in Kessen.
He appears in Capcom's Sengoku Basara spinoff Sengoku Basara: Sanada Yukimura-den. He was known as "Magician" of Sengoku in the game.
Masayuki appears as a minor character in the social romance sim Samurai Love Ballad (天下統一恋の乱 Love Ballad) produced by Voltage (company).

Sanada Yukimura
Sanada Yukimura appears in numerous films, including the musical film Brave Records of the Sanada Clan (1963), where he is played by Minoru Chiaki of Seven Samurai fame as a rather ineffectual leader.
Yukimura/Nobushige is the main character in the 55th NHK taiga drama Sanada Maru (2016) and is portrayed by Sakai Masato.
Koei's Samurai Warriors series. Similar to Zhao Yun of the Dynasty Warriors series, Yukimura is the icon for Samurai Warriors and thus usually placed on the game manual/cover Perhaps because of this, in both games so far his lifespan and prominence have been greatly extended. In the first game, he was portrayed as Takeda Shingen's second-in-command even at the Fourth Battle of Kawanakajima - which occurred 6 years before he was born historically. In the second game, the extension is more modest, but he is still portrayed as a major Takeda officer at the Battle of Nagashino, when he would have been 8. Both games feature the Summer Siege of Osaka Castle as his last and most notable battle. In many character storylines and endings, he is killed in battle at Osaka Castle. In one of his SW endings, he, Kunoichi, Uesugi Kenshin, and Takeda Shingen unite the land. In his SW2 ending, he proves his strength to his friend Maeda Keiji, and he saves Naoe Kanetsugu. Together, they united the land in honor of Ishida Mitsunari. He is also in the spinoff called Samurai Warriors Katana. Throughout the games Yukimura had a somewhat romantic relationship with his bodyguard Kunoichi. In the related series Warriors Orochi he was tricked by Orochi into thinking that Zhao Yun and the other resistance were phantoms. After losing to Zhao Yun in a fight, he realized that he was deceived, and apologizing, compensated his error by joining forces with Zhao Yun to help rescue Liu Bei. In the sequel, he works with Shima Sakon and Zhang Jiao to save Naoe Kanetsugu. In Dream Mode, he works with Zhao Yun and Shimazu Yoshihiro in saving Liu Bei and peasants.
Akimine Kamijyo's popular anime and manga series Samurai Deeper Kyo has Sanada as a main character. He is depicted as a lighthearted, beautiful trickster with a love of battle, wine, women, and almost supernatural prowess as a tactician. He had a notable admiration for the then-late Toyotomi Hideyoshi.
In Capcom's series Sengoku Basara he is traditionally one of the main characters. He serves under Takeda Shingen alongside Sarutobi Sasuke and has a major rivalry with Date Masamune. He wields two yari spears. In Sengoku Basara 3 Yukimura becomes the commander of the Takeda forces after Shingen falls ill. Soichiro Hoshi provides Yukimura's voice in the games and anime. Kouhei Takeda plays him in the Live Action TV Drama.
In the popular anime and manga series Prince of Tennis, Japan's #1 school Rikkai Daigoku's captain is named Seiichi Yukimura, and their vice-captain is named Genichiro Sanada. Likewise, Echizen Ryoma, who defeated the two forementioned players, shares his last name with the commander whose troops killed Sanada Yukimura.
Sanada Yukimura appears in his own anime called Sanada Juyushi Special (together with his brother Angelo Sanada), directed by Shimizu Keizo.
Sanada Yukimura was portrayed by comedian Gino Jinnai in the movie Kamen Rider Den-O: I am Born!. His Braves also made a cameo in the movie.
In the anime series Musashi Gundoh, the voice of Sanada Yukimura is played by Sayaka Kinoshita.
In the manga series Tenjho Tenge, he appears during a flashback taking place days before the summer siege of Osaka castle.
Sanada is one of the three playable characters in the videogame Vasara.
Yukimura is one of the main characters in the manga series "Brave 10", drawn by Shimotsuki Marlin.
He is a playable character in Pokémon Conquest (Pokémon + Nobunaga's Ambition in Japan), with his partner Pokémon being Charmeleon and later Charizard. He is brave and very loyal to his lord Shingen.
In the anime series Girls und Panzer, the gunner of Team Hippo, Kiyomi Sugiyama, calls herself Saemonza, Yukimura's nickname. She also wears his mon of three columns of two coins as a headband.
In the video game Super Mario Odyssey, Mario can obtain a suit of samurai armor and helmet with a design similar to that of Yukimura's helmet, featuring antlers and his six-coin mon.
Yukimura is a playable character in the social romance sim Samurai Love Ballad (天下統一恋の乱 Love Ballad) produced by Voltage (company).
Yukimura is a playable character in the visual novel game (purchasable through Apple and Samsung) Ikemen Sengoku; Romances Across Time, produced by Cybird (company)
Yukimura is a primary antagonist in the video game Nioh second and third DLC expansions, Defiant Honor and Bloodshed's End. In here, he commands the forces sieged in the Osaka Castle, defending Toyotomi Hideyori from the Tokugawa forces. He later dies at the end of Bloodshed's End. He uses a spear and both fire and wind elements. His 2 guardian spirits are a horse and a butterfly-human hybrid.
In Oda Cinnamon Nobunaga, Yukimura is reincarnated in modern-day Japan as a Corgi nicknamed "Marutarou".

Sasaki Kojirō
Sasaki Kojirō is featured in Japanese author Eiji Yoshikawa's epic historical fiction novel about Miyamoto Musashi, Musashi. He and Musashi each have separate parallel plotlines and various sub-plots before they intertwine, with the pair's famous duel the climax and final chapter of the novel.
Sasaki Kojirō is portrayed by Kōji Tsuruta in two installments of the Samurai Trilogy of films, based on Yoshikawa's novel. He is featured in Samurai II: Duel at Ichijoji Temple and Samurai III: Duel at Ganryu Island, the latter centered on his battle with Musashi.
The birth and growth of Sasaki Kojirō is featured in Vagabond by Takehiko Inoue, a manga based on Yoshikawa's novel, though in it, Kojirō is portrayed as being deaf.
Yoshikawa's novel is also the basis of the 42nd NHK taiga drama of the same name from 2003. The NHK serial retains the novel's plot structure, developing parallels between the lives of Sasaki and Musashi and thus rendering Sasaki a major character, portrayed in the show by Matsuoka Matsuhiro.
In the game Brave Fencer Musashi, the title character's sworn rival was named after Kojirō. And in Musashi: Samurai Legend, the main villain was named Gandrake (Ganryũ).
In the manga Wangan Midnight, Gen Sasaki is named after Sasaki Kojirō, as they share the family name, Sasaki.
In the manga Shūmatsu no Valkyrie, Sasaki Kojiro is retratem like the greatest loser of history and is the third fighter from humanity's side that fights against the God Poseidon. 
In the manga by Masami Kurumada, Fuma no Kojiro, Sasaki Kojiro and Miyamoto Musashi are main characters. An Anime version of Fuma no Kojiro was released in 1992.
Kojirō appears as the main spirit in the manga Kensei Tsubame (剣聖ツバメ lit. Sword Saint Tsubame), a story about kendo practitioners who become possessed by the spirits of many famous Japanese swordsmen. The protagonist, who is possessed by Kojirō, is named Tsubame Kamoshita. His name is probably a reference to Kojirō's technique.
In Pokémon, the Japanese name of James (of Team Rocket) is Kojiro. Additionally, James's partner Jessie's Japanese name is Musashi, a reference to Miyamoto Musashi.
In the visual novel and anime series Fate/stay night, the Servant Assassin introduces himself as Sasaki Kojirō. However, it is debated whether his true identity is actually Sasaki, as he claims that he only took Kojiro's name. In episode 18 of the anime, Saber recognizes Assassin as Kojiro. Assassin then claims Kojiro is but a fake name and that the person called Sasaki Kojirou does not exist; he is but a character with a fabricated past that has been made into a master swordsman inside people's memories.
In Samurai Warriors 2 by Koei, Kojiro appears as an enemy officer and an unlockable bodyguard, but not a playable character except through Nene's special ability (taking on the appearance and moveset of an officer nearby) and in Samurai Warriors 2: Empires. Kojiro is a playable character in Samurai Warriors 2: Xtreme Legends, with his own Story Mode, focused mainly on pursuing and fight Musashi. The ending features Kojiro becoming rather upset after killing Musashi, and his Dream Stage has Kojiro realizing that he wants to fight alongside Musashi, rather than kill him, and they battle their way through a series of officers and challenges to reach Oda Nobunaga. His skin color is bone white (possibly as white face paint), and he is depicted as an evil minded and bloodthirsty fiend who claims to give his enemies a "beautiful end". He appears in Warriors Orochi 2 where he joins the Samurai faction under Sakon Shima to be "closer to" Musashi.
Kibagami Genjyuro from the Samurai Shodown series, is based on Kojiro just as Haohmaru is based on Musashi.
In Gosho Aoyama's Yaiba, Sasaki Kojiro was revived from his death after the final battle with Miyamoto Musashi, Yaiba's teacher. He was brought to life by Yaiba's nemesis Onimaru in an attempt to defeat Yaiba. However, after a twisted turn of event he then join Yaiba and the gang. His reputation as cool, handsome, and know his way around girls as often portrayed in many fiction about him was parodied in this series as he is shown as a complete womanizer, playboy, and even has a radar for beautiful woman. His appearance in this series was almost entirely comedic although the same would also apply to almost all of the character.
In Dr. Slump, Arale, Gatchan, and Taro used the "Time Slipper" to travel to the day of Musashi's duel with Kojiro. It states that Musashi was late for the duel over a two-day game of Rock, Paper, Scissors. Kojiro is shown waiting impatiently for Musashi, and is left waiting after Musashi goes with Arale to the future.
Kojiro's Tsubame Gaeshi (Swallow Reversal/Turning Swallow) technique is used by Shusuke Fuji in Prince of Tennis, and by Sanada Kazuki in Fighting Spirit. The technique is also featured in Yu-Gi-Oh! Trading Card Game as the card "Swallow Flip", as well as in Pokémon game series as the move "Aerial Ace". It is also the signature technique for the character Seraphim in "Is This A Zombie?".
The sword Monohoshizao appears in Soul Blade, the first game of the popular Soulcalibur series of fighting games. It was an extra weapon for Heishiro Mitsurugi (who is based on Miyamoto Musashi), but it was simply named "Kojiro's sword". It later became an alternate weapon for Yoshimitsu in the third part: Soulcalibur II where it is described as a sword that was used by the renowned Japanese swordsman named Kojiroh Sasaki. In Soulcalibur III, it appears as an alternate weapon for the bonus character Arthur, a counterpart to Mitsurugi.
Kojiro is an unlockable character in the Ubisoft/Genki game Sword of the Samurai. Which also has Ganryu Island a selectable arena. Also the game features Miyamoto with an actual oar instead of a self-modified oar-Suburito.
Akane Takeda, from the Visual Novel Hanachirasu, develops Kojiro's Tsubame Gaeshi technique to counter Igarasu Yoshia's Hiru-no-Tsuki, which is an attack in which Igarasu launches himself overhead to attack the back, thus Akane literally "Cuts a swallow from flight."

Shibata Katsuie
Shibata Katsuie's army plays a major role in the 1953 classic film Ugetsu monogatari.
Shibata is a playable general in Koei's Kessen III in which he is clad in black 'Oni' armour, and looks the same facially in both Kessen III and Samurai Warriors 2, showing some continuity. he appears as a non-playable character in the sequel to Sengoku Period-based video game Samurai Warriors 2 as it's known in the US and Europe and also in Samurai Warriors Katana. He is available as an unlockable bodyguard through Samurai Warriors 2 'Survival' mode. He returns in the Empires expansion as a fully playable character. However, in Samurai Warriors 2 Xtreme Legends, uses a pair of hand-axes instead of a spear, making him a fully fledged unique character. In his story, he eventually gets to marry his love, Oichi, and he helps to teach Maeda Toshiie to be a true warrior. He and Oichi kill themselves by way of setting their castle on fire in his ending, preventing Hideyoshi from getting them as allies, and making Maeda Toshiie sad and upset. In Warriors Orochi 2, he works with Oda Nobunaga, Ishida Mitsunari, and Xiahou Dun at repelling Dong Zhuo and killing Taira Kiyomori at Tong Gate. In Dream Mode, he works with Maeda Toshiie, Sun Jian, Sun Ce, and Cao Ren in protecting Oichi from Yuan Shao and Liu Biao.
He is portrayed in the eroge Sengoku Rance as a children's lover so that Rance thinks he is a lolicon. He will eventually become Ranmaru's husband after doing Ranmaru's events to clear her. His feelings about Kōhime, Oda Nobunaga Kazunosuke's younger sister, may be a pun of Shibata being the second husband of Oichi, younger sister of the true Oda Nobunaga.
Katsuie appears in Sengoku Basara 4 as a low-rank vanguard under the Oda force. In the past he tried to rebel but failed. He is despaired in everything to the point that he's even losing emotions.
He is also a character in the anime The Ambition of Oda Nobuna as a female protagonist serving Oda Nobunaga.
Katsuie appears as a minor character in the social romance sim Samurai Love Ballad (天下統一恋の乱 Love Ballad) produced by Voltage (company).
He appears in Nioh 2 as a supporting character and later into a boss after using the Spirit Stones. He is racist against yõkai and the protagonist (as they are a human-yõkai hybrid) but grows to respect the protagonist based on the player's actions.  He uses dual hatchets and the fire element. His guardian spirit is a boar.
He appears as a non-playable character in Fate/Grand Order and as a Berserker-class Servant, especially in the GUDAGUDA events.

Shima Sakon
Shima Sakon is a playable character in Samurai Warriors 2, where he is portrayed as a former servant of Takeda Shingen and wields an oversized falchion. He also makes vague impersonations of Elvis Presley, which are seen on his sideburns and his quotes ("Thank you. Thank you very much.", "Sakon... has left the battlefield."). He must be defeated by the Eastern Army in the Battle of Kusegawa. In his ending, he and Ishida Mitsunari unite Japan. He also appears in the spinoff called Samurai Warriors Katana. He also appears in Warriors Orochi as an enemy and later ally in the Wu storyline. He developed a friendship with Lu Meng. In the sequel, Sakon is the leading character of one of the five storylines of the game, as Sakon unites the various samurai clans of Oda, Takeda and Uesugi, along with the Kingdom of Wu, in an attempt to prevent the resurrection of Orichi. He also develops a friendly relationship with the mystic Fu Xi.
He also appears in the Kessen series and in Samurai Warriors Katana.
Sakon appears in Onimusha: Dawn of Dreams, where his mind is twisted and brainwashed by Ophelia, one of the Genma Triumvirate. Tenkai Nankobo uses his purification skills to free Sakon of the evil mind-altering.
Sakon is a manga series loosely based on Sakon's life, illustrated by Tetsuo Hara. He survives Sekigahara and is ordered by his lord to disrupt a plot set by Tokugawa Ieyasu's kagemusha.
In the manga Tenjho Tenge authored by Oh! Great, a character is directly named after him, Sakon Shima.
Sakon is playable in Sengoku Basara 4 as a cheerful young man who enjoys gambling and his flirtatious look. He serves under Ishida Mitsunari.
Sakon appears as a minor character in the social romance sim Samurai Love Ballad (天下統一恋の乱 Love Ballad) produced by Voltage (company).
Sakon appears as a secondary antagonist in Nioh, being a loyal servant of Mitsunari who survives the battle of Sekigahara and is later present at his master's execution. He uses a spear and the lightning element due to his guardian spirit, a lion-like creature. Later in the game he uses the wind element and gains the guardian spirit of his master, a fox.

Shimazu Yoshihiro
Shimazu Yoshihiro appears in the Koei game Kessen.
He also appears in Capcom's Sengoku Basara, where he wields a giant sword and a drunkard. In the game's sequel, Sengoku Basara 2, he is determined to duel Honda Tadakatsu to determine who is stronger.
Yoshihiro is present in Koei's Samurai Warriors 2. While still portrayed as an old man, he wields a giant mallet and has a rivalry with Tachibana Ginchiyo (heiress to the Tachibana of Kyushu), while the surprise attack before Sekigahara is proposed by Toyohisa (and rejected by Mitsunari for honor's sake) at the opening of the Sekigahara stage. He unites the land under the Shimazu. He also appears in the spin-off series Warriors Orochi as a starter character for Shu Han, alongside Zhao Yun and Xing Cai. He assists Xing Cai and the mystic Zuo Ci in freeing Zhao Yun from Orochi's prison in Ueda Castle. In the sequel, he joins the samurai alliance. He works with Huang Zhong in saving Lu Meng and Gan Ning from Lu Bu's forces. In Dream Mode, he works with Zhao Yun and Sanada Yukimura in rescuing Liu Bei and peasants.
In the eroge Sengoku Rance, the four brothers of Shimazu family are Yoshihisa, Kazuhisa, Toshihisa and Iehisa. While Yoshihisa, Toshihisa, Iehisa really were Yoshihiro's brothers, the second brother, Kazuhisa's name may be the reference of Shimazu Katsuhisa, Yoshihiro's father Takahisa's adopted father.
He was mentioned by Haruo Niijima in Kenichi: The Mightiest Disciple when Niijima was trapped and planned to use the method Shimazu used to charge through the Ragnorok's surroundings.
He is a playable character in Pokémon Conquest (Pokémon + Nobunaga's Ambition in Japan), with his partner Pokémon being Gurdurr and later Conkeldurr.

Suzuki Magoichi
In most of his fictional portrayals, Suzuki Magoichi is often referred to his more common name, Saiga Magoichi.
In Onimusha 2, Saika Magoichi is a calm musketeer trying to protect Saiga village from Nobunaga's army. He feels indebted to the women of the village because his mother died at a young age, so the women raised him. He raises doubts among Ankokuji Ekei and Yagyu Jubei (actually he was the first Jubei, grandfather of the infamous Yagyu Jubei Mitsuyoshi, Yagyu Muneyoshi) when Tokichiro Kinoshita/Toyotomi Hideyoshi accuses him of serving Nobunaga. This same Magoichi is also in Onimusha Tactics, as well as Onimusha Blade Warriors. He also served as a mentor to Ohatsu, Oichi's/Oyu's daughter, from Onimusha: Dawn of Dreams, tutoring her in the wielding of firearms. Judging from the timeline, it is likely that this Magoichi is Saika Shigehide.
Magoichi is also a playable character in the Samurai Warriors series, wielding in all installments a musket with underbarrel bayonet. Magoichi is laid back and dressed in a trench coat. He bears no resemblance to either Suzuki Shigetomo nor Suzuki Sadayu (in fact, he cannot be Suzuki Sadayu; Suzuki is a separate character in the sequel). He fights to protect the people he cares about most as well as for the ladies, and even makes a friendly rival out of Maeda Keiji. He has a slight womanizing obsession. In his story path, beginning with the Battle of Ise (a fictional representation of the fall of Nagashima), and following a continuing anti-Nobunaga campaign, one ending has him becoming a wanderer after the surrender of the Ishiyama Honganji (having joined their campaign against Nobunaga), whereas a second ending has him years later raiding Azuchi Castle and killing Nobunaga.
In Samurai Warriors 2, his storyline is revised to have him be a mercenary leader originally on friendly terms with Hashiba Hideyoshi, first fighting for Nobunaga at Anegawa and then opposing him in a later stage at Osaka Bay (intended to briefly touch on the Honganji). Angered by a retaliatory attack on his village (though he is able to mitigate the damage) and temporarily breaking his friendship with Hideyoshi, he rushes over to Honnō-ji where, amidst the chaos, he shoots and kills Nobunaga, and repentant Akechi Mitsuhide is the one to take the blame. Ironically enough at the end of the Battle of Yamazaki (his final stage) while standing over Mitsuhide's body he is mortally wounded by a random shot in the back fired from offscreen, and his ending has him surviving long enough to stagger into camp before collapsing and apparently dying in Hideyoshi's arms. He is shown surviving in several endings however, even though they are set years after Yamazaki. In Date Masamune's ending, the two strike an alliance, a relationship that is shown further in Samurai Warriors 3. In Warriors Orochi, Magoichi helps Zhao Yun and his army to free Yue Ying from Orochi's forces, and later joins forces with Shu Han at the end of the stage. His personality still is of a womanizer, attempting to flirt with the female Chinese characters such as Xing Cai, Yue Ying, Da Qiao, Zhu Rong, and even, Orochi's strategist, Da Ji. He even attempts to flirt with Zhang He at one point, not knowing that the extremely feminine Zhang is a man.
Koei also depicts him in the Nobunaga's Ambition series (in particular installments XI and XII) and in Taikou Risshiden (in particular V). He also appears as an enemy general in Kessen III.
He is also a hidden playable character in Visco Games' arcade shoot 'em up Vasara 2, and is the grandfather of the female Saiga Magoichi in the original game, Vasara.
Magoichi are two of the captains who have generic faces in the eroge Sengoku Rance (they take the names "Saiga Magoichi" and "Saika Magoichi").
Magoichi appears in Sengoku Basara 3, appearing this time as a woman named Saika Magoichi (or Lady Saika in historical records). As Magoichi was the common name for the leader of the Saika Renegades, it still fits. This version of Magoichi carries a set of revolvers and other firearms at her disposal.
He is a playable character in Pokémon Conquest (Pokémon + Nobunaga's Ambition in Japan), with his partner Pokémon being Grovyle and later Sceptile. He also appears as a womanizer in this game.

Tachibana Ginchiyo
Tachibana Ginchiyo appears in Koei's Samurai Warriors series of video games. She is a popular character despite her debut and only appearance in Samurai Warriors 2, Samurai Warriors 2 Empires and Samurai Warriors 2: Xtreme Legends (not counting Warriors Orochi). In the game, she has a rivalry with Shimazu Yoshihiro, the daimyō of Satsuma. In Xtreme Legends, she becomes an ally of Chōsokabe Motochika alongside Shimazu Yoshihiro. In reference to her father Tachibana Dosetsu her attacks are centered on lightning; one of her special abilities is to summon a lightning storm, or augment her sword with a lightning attribute. In her ending, she forgives the Shimazu clan and lets them live, but Shimazu Yoshihiro dies from battle wounds. In the sequel, she is joined by her husband. She also gets the honor of being the first female character in the Warriors series as a whole to wield a sword. She is also a character in Samurai Warriors Katana, a spinoff of Samurai Warriors for the Nintendo Wii. She also appears in the Warriors Orochi crossover game. She is seen by Zhao Yun, Xing Cai, and Yoshihiro Shimazu, escaping Ueda Castle, at the same time Cai and Shimazu are freeing Zhao Yun. She escapes with them, and joins Zhao Yun's Shu Han forces. In the sequel, Okuni brings Ginchiyo to Wu. She works with her equal in strength, Zhu Rong, in defeating Cao Ren. In Dream Mode, she works with Imagawa Yoshimoto and Xing Cai in saving their allies in Chen Cang Castle. In Warriors Orochi 3 updated series, it is revealed that she has a knowledge about Abe no Seimei, whom she recognized him from the history report about him, upon first meeting him while she's on a mission with Kaguya and Wang Yuanji.
Ginchiyo also appears in Koei's Kessen III as a hidden character, voiced by Naomi Shindō.
A woman who inherits the name Tachibana Gin appears in Horizon in the Middle of Nowhere wielding two dual sword weapons as well as four large cross shaped artillery weapons.
She is a playable character in a sidequest in Pokémon Conquest (Pokémon + Nobunaga's Ambition in Japan), with her partner Pokémon being Shinx and later Luxio or Luxray.
Ginchiyo appears as a supporting character, alongside her husband, in 2017's Nioh. Her guardian spirit is a dog which joins her husband's guardian spirit to form a paired dog spirit, showing the love and partnership of her and her husband.

Tachibana Muneshige
Tachibana Muneshige appears in Koei's Samurai Warriors series of video games. He debuted in Samurai Warriors 3, wielding a sword and shield and is shown to have a peculiar relationship with his wife. The Tachibana fight together with Mouri Motonari to protect Japan from Oda Nobunaga's threat.
In the eroge Sengoku Rance, he, along with his adopted father (also father-in-law) Tachibana Dousetsu, are generic-faced captains.
In Sengoku Hime, his fathers Tachibana Dousetsu and Takahashi Shouun are gender-swapped and they are major generals of the Otomo family.
He appears in Sengoku Basara 3 as a loyal (but troubled) retainer to the Otomo. He wields a set of katar with chainsaws on them and is depicted to be a large, solid man.
A man who inherits his name appears in Horizon in the Middle of Nowhere and wields a gunblade for the fictional country of Tres España.
He is a playable character in Pokémon Conquest (Pokémon + Nobunaga's Ambition in Japan), with his partner Pokémon being Starly, Staravia, and Staraptor.
Muneshige appears as a supporting character, alongside his wife, in 2017's Nioh. He uses a sword and the lightning element. His guardian spirit is a dog which joins his wife's guardian spirit to form a paired dog spirit, showing the love and partnership of him and his wife.

Takeda Shingen
The 1988 NHK Taiga drama television series Takeda Shingen is a fictionalized account of Takeda Shingen's life with Kiichi Nakai in the title role. His life is also dramatized in NHK's 46th Taiga drama Fūrin Kazan. Akira Kurosawa's 1980 film Kagemusha was also inspired by his life; it brought the musket-wound theory to public attention outside Japan.
Takeda Shingen appears in Toshirō Mifune's historical film Samurai Banners (風林火山 Furin Kazan).
He also appears in the epic film Heaven and Earth. The film's title is a reference to Takeda Shingen's famous quote, "In heaven and earth, I alone am to be revered".
In the science-fiction film Sengoku Jieitai, in English also known as Time Slip and G.I. Samurai, a group of JSDF soldiers take on his forces. In this instance, he is killed in personal combat by the unit's leader, 2nd Lieutenant Iba.
He is a playable character in the Samurai Warriors series by Koei. In SW1, he frees Uesugi Kenshin and lets him live. Another ending and his ending in SW2 have the Uesugi and the Takeda uniting Japan together. He is also a character in Kessen III by the same company and in Samurai Warriors Katana. In Warriors Orochi, he arrives to meet Nobunaga Oda at Honnoji, but ends up helping Oda, Huang Zhong, and Xiahou Dun fend off Da Ji's forces. He forms an alliance with his nemesis, Kenshin Uesugi. In the main story, Uesugi and Takeda fall at Nagashino, while Nobunaga's forces are at Guan Du. In the Gaiden stage, aid is sent by Nobunaga to Nagashino, in the form of Huang Zhong and Guan Ping. Takeda and Uesugi join with Nobunaga in the Wu Zhang Plains to defeat Orochi's forces. At Koshi Castle, the Takeda, the Uesugi, and the Oda kill Orochi. In Warriors Orochi 2, Sakon reunites, the Takeda, the Uesugi, and the Oda to fight Orochi. Takeda Shingen recruits Sima Yi and defeating him at Chang Ban. He and Naoe Kanetsugu tried to do the same for Date Masamune, but it did not work. Takeda Shingen works with Fu Xi and Shima Sakon in killing Orochi at Sekigahara. In Dream Mode, he works with Zhuge Liang, Gan Ning, Taishi Ci, and Zhou Yu at He Fei Castle, repelling Shima Sakon's forces, Uesugi Kenshin, and Sima Yi's forces.
He is a playable character with a very large staff axe in Sengoku Basara. In Sengoku Basara 3, he is rarely seen due to his sickness. In Yukimura's second story, he appears, completely healthy, to watch over Yukimura's final battle with Masamune. (At least, the last in this particular sequel.)
Takeda Shingen is the main character in the NES game Shingen the Ruler, and his conquests are also portrayed in the video game, Takeda. Shingen also appears as a character in the Samurai Warriors and in Nobunaga's Ambition (信長の野望 Nobunaga no Yabo) game series, as well as Sengoku Basara
The board game Shogun features Takeda Shingen as one of the daimyōs to choose.
In the eroge Sengoku Rance, he is the ruler of the Takeda clan, who might be dead before the events of the game. His four chief retainers, the advisor Sanada Tourin, the cavalries Baba Shouen and Yamagata Masakage, the ninja Kousaka Yoshikage are based on four of Takeda Shingen's 24 head generals: Sanada Yukitaka, Baba Nobufusa (Baba Nobuharu), Yamagata Masakage and Kōsaka Masanobu.
In the series Mirage of Blaze, Takeda Shingen is an evil spirit ready to be awoken by loyal retainers who have been reincarnated in the modern age. His resurrection is stopped by those in Uesugi Kenshin's army—more inclusively, his adopted son Uesugi Kagetora.
Takeda Shingen was mentioned in episode 10 of The Tatami Galaxy when the protagonist noted that a tatami- room is perfect, and if a room were to be larger than the size of  tatami mats, it would end up being "as spacious as Takeda Shingen's lavatory, and one might even get lost".
One of his notable descendants is video game music composer Ryu Umemoto (1974–2011).
He is a playable character in Pokémon Conquest (Pokémon + Nobunaga's Ambition in Japan), with his partner Pokémon being Rhyperior and later Groudon.
Battle Girls: Time Paradox a 2011 gender swap anime, A maiden feudal general who led most powerful cavalry and wields a large fan and controls wind and fire. She owns a section of the Crimson Armor and is friends/rivals with Kenshin. She is rather awkward in expressing herself and never aware about the armor.
Shingen is a playable character in the social romance sim Samurai Love Ballad (天下統一恋の乱 Love Ballad) produced by Voltage (company).
Shingen is a playable character in the visual novel game (purchasable through Apple and Samsung) Ikemen Sengoku; Romances Across Time, produced by Cybird (company)
In Oda Cinnamon Nobunaga, Shingen is reincarnated in modern-day Japan as a Pomeranian nicknamed "Lucky".

Takenaka Shigeharu
Takenaka Shigeharu is often likened to Zhuge Liang of Romance of the Three Kingdoms. This is mostly due to a romanticized tale of Hideyoshi needing to visit Shigeharu many times before gaining his services, much similar to Liu Bei's three visits to Zhuge Liang.
Shigeharu (as Hanbei) is featured in the game Sengoku Basara 2 by Capcom. Voice actor Akira Ishida voices him. He wields a whipsword and is shown to be very physically weak and ill due to tuberculosis. Despite his impending death due to his illness, he is very faithfully devoted to Toyotomi Hideyoshi.
He also appears as Hanbei in Samurai Warriors 3 where he is depicted as a young precocious teenager fighting with a bladed sundial. He is shown to have a close relationship with Kuroda Kanbei.
He is a playable character as Hanbei in Pokémon Conquest (Pokémon + Nobunaga's Ambition in Japan), with his partner Pokémon being Pikachu and later Raichu. He appears as a sleepy teenager with astonishing brainpower.

Tokugawa Ieyasu
Within the video game series Samurai Warriors, Tokugawa Ieyasu is depicted as a man that values patience and the welfare of his subordinates above all else. Equipped with the kabuto that he was historically valued for, Ieyasu also wields a romanticized spear that has the ability to shoot flames and cannonballs from its center. He is in the spinoff called Samurai Warriors Katana. In Warriors Orochi, he is a starter character, for Wu, alongside Sun Ce and Hattori Hanzō. Although resenting having to carry out the evil Orochi's orders, he resolves to patiently wait for the right moment to rebel, and encourages Sun Ce to do the same. In Warriors Orochi 2, he joins forces with Shu. He tries to save Date Masamune's soul at Saika village, but he fails. For Shu's ending, he tells Liu Bei that though Taigong Wang was young and cocky, "he was a good man at heart." In Dream Mode, he works with Oda Nobunaga and Toyotomi Hideyoshi in proving their strength to Liu Bei, Cao Cao, and Sun Quan at Fan Castle.
The Akira Kurosawa film Kagemusha tells a fictionalized account of the events leading up to the Battle of Nagashino.
Portrayed by James Saito in the 2008 BBC docudrama series Heroes and Villains.
The novel Kagemusha Tokugawa Ieyasu by Keichiro Ryu tells the fictional story of the Ieyasu's double who changes places into assassination Ieyasu ahead of the Battle of Sekigahara. The novel was adapted to manga by Tetsuo Hara.
Another novel, The Kouga Ninja Scrolls and its adaptations, Shinobi: Heart Under Blade and Basilisk (manga), are fictional stories in which Ieyasu is central to the storylines.
Ieyasu appears as the leader of the Japanese civilization in Sid Meier's turn-based strategy game Civilization III, as well as in its sequel Civilization IV. He also appears as the Japanese leader in the series' console version Civilization Revolution.
Ieyasu is a recurring character in the manga series Samurai Deeper Kyo.
Tokugawa Ieyasu is depicted as one of the six survivors of the destruction of the colony ship Mesopotamia in the anime series Saber Marionette J. He and the other five survivors (all male) land on the planet that becomes known as Terra II, and each man founds a new city-state reflective of his respective heritage. Each city-state is populated by clones of the founder; the Ieyasu that appears at the start of the series is the 15th cloned incarnation of the original.
He is also featured as a non-playable character in Sengoku Basara. He appears as a man of short stature but has command of a very powerful general, namely Honda Tadakatsu. He appears in Sengoku Basara 3 with an updated, more mature character design and using new gauntlets in battle. His goal is to unite Japan by the force of "bonds". He has a rivalry against Ishida Mitsunari, and his ending confirming that they used to be friends, as he weeps over Mitsunari's death.
The history of Ieyasu's rise to power is fictionalized in James Clavell's novel Shōgun under the name "Lord Toranaga," and in the television miniseries based on it.
The board game Shogun, features Tokugawa Ieyasu as one of the Daimyōs to choose.
In the game Age of Empires III: The Asian Dynasties, Tokugawa's reunification of Japan is one of the campaigns of the game. He can also be unlocked in normal mode and is available as Japanese Shogun. He can train units, receive shipments and boosts attack of units around him. He also appears as the leader of Japan in Skirmish Mode.
Tokugawa Ieyasu is the birth father of Yuki Hideyasu, who is the lead of the video game Onimusha: Dawn of Dreams. In game, he goes by the alias Soki.
Tokugawa Ieyasu is the raccoon dog youkai lord of the Tokugawa clan in the eroge Sengoku Rance. His five chief retainers are Honda Tadakatsu, Hattori Hanzō, Sakai Tadatsugu, Sakakibara Yasumasa, Ii Naomasa and are portrayed as raccoon dogs like him. Another raccoon dog youkai is also based on a general of Tokugawa clan, Honda Masanobu.
Tokugawa is a main character in the video game Kessen.
He appears in a flashback sequence in the manga Tenjho Tenge, as a man who is literally possessed by Sohaku Kago. His granddaughter Senhime also makes a more prominent appearance.
Tokugawa is mentioned in Vampire Weekend's song, "Giving up the Gun".
His name is used for Vongola Primo's Japanese name in Katekyo Hitman Reborn!.
A gender-switched version of Ieyasu appears in Sengoku Otome: Momoiro Paradox.
"The Red Sash of Tokugawa Ieyasu" was an artifact featured in an episode of the 1990s Nickelodeon game show Legends of the Hidden Temple.
A version of Ieyasu appears in Gaim's portion of Kamen Rider x Kamen Rider Gaim & Wizard: The Fateful Sengoku Movie Battle. He is the Lord of the Wizard Army and lost his Bujin Rider, Bujin Wizard, to Bujin Gaim. He mistakes Kouta Kazuraba/Armored Rider Gaim for Bujin Wizard's killer but realizes the two are not the same. He hires Kouta and Mitsuzane Kureshima/Armored Rider Ryugen as his new Bujins. After Bujin Fourze and Mitsuzane are 'killed' by the Nephenthes Inhumanoid, he reveals his intention to unify people in his world and bring forth an era of peace. He later gives Haruto Soma/Kamen Rider Wizard the Infinity Ring formerly owned by Bujin Wizard. He is last seen farewelling the Armored Riders and Mai. He is portrayed by JOY.
He is a playable character in Pokémon Conquest (Pokémon + Nobunaga's Ambition in Japan), with his partner Pokémon being Aggron and later Registeel.
Ieyasu is a playable character in the social romance sim Samurai Love Ballad (天下統一恋の乱 Love Ballad) produced by Voltage (company).
Tokugawa Ieyasu appears in the Star Trek novel Home Is the Hunter.
Ieyasu is a playable character in the visual novel game (purchasable through Apple and Samsung) Ikemen Sengoku; Romances Across Time, produced by Cybird (company)
He can be seen in the anime television series Dinosaur king where he helps the d-team find the cosmos stone.
Ieyasu is a supporting character in the video game Nioh, as William's benefactor and Okatsu's father. He becomes shõgun at the end of the game. His guardian spirit is a tanuki.

Toyotomi Hideyoshi

Eiji Yoshikawa's novel Taiko ki (English title: Taiko: An Epic Novel of War and Glory in Feudal Japan) is about the life of Toyotomi Hideyoshi.
Hideyoshi appears in the Samurai Warriors and Warriors Orochi game series. In Samurai Warriors: Xtreme Legends and SW2, he unites the land and allows many enemies to live. In Warriors Orochi series, he works with Oda Nobunaga in killing Orochi twice. He is reunited with Nene, his wife, in Warriors Orochi 2. In this series, he finds many women throughout the battlefields to be attractive. In Dream Mode, he works with Oda Nobunaga, and Tokugawa Ieyasu in proving their strength to Cao Cao, Liu Bei and Sun Quan at Fan Castle. He is also in Samurai Warriors Katana, a spinoff of the SW series.
He is a playable character in the game Sengoku Basara 2 as a giant man able to grab onto soldiers, blowing off a volley of arrows, even parting the sea, with his bare hands. He wants nothing more but power, so much that he killed his historical wife in order to become a unifier of Japan. He had a one-sided friendship with Maeda Keiji a long time ago until he was changed while being humiliated and injured by Matsunaga Hisahide. in Sengoku Basara 3, Hideyoshi is killed by Ieyasu Tokugawa before the events of the game. Mitsunari Ishida seeks to kill Ieyasu to avenge Hideyoshi, although in anime, he was killed by Masamune Date and Mitsunari wants to kill Masamune for revenge.
Appearing in the Onimusha series, Hideyoshi was a major antagonist in the first two games while vassal to Nobunaga. Onimusha: Dawn of Dreams, where he is one of the principal antagonists, gives a fictional portrayal of Hideyoshi's reign and death.
He is also the center of Koei's Taikou Risshiden series of games, which focus primarily on Hideyoshi's rise to prominence.
In the game Age of Empires II: The Conquerors Expansion, in the "Kyoto" scenario, the player, as Toyotomi Hideyoshi, must fight to avenge "Lord Nobunaga's" death in Kyoto.
Toyotomi (or his faction) is a selectable character in the Shogun: Total War and Throne of Darkness games.
The character Taikō Nakamura in James Clavell's novel Shōgun is a pastiche of Toyotomi.
The board game Shogun, features Hashiba (Toyotomi) Hideyoshi as one of the Daimyōs to choose.
In the eroges Sengoku Rance and Sengoku Hime, he is portrayed as a monkey named Toukichirou, which is Hideyoshi's other name (in Sengoku Rance) or a monkey general (in Sengoku Hime).
Hideyoshi also appears in the anime series, Sengoku Otome: Momoiro Paradox, where he is instead portrayed as a modern-day school girl named Yoshino Hide (a pun on Hideyoshi) who somehow winds up in Feudal Japan where she meets gender-swapped versions of the heroes during the Sengoku Period.
In the strategy game Pokémon + Nobunaga's Ambition, he is featured with a Monferno. A special Wi-Fi episode focusing on him later reveals his connection to Reshiram, like Nobunaga is partnered to Zekrom.
Professional wrestler Michael Nakazawa wrestled as Hideyoshi for the Dramatic Dream Team promotion on February 10, 2013.
A version of Hideyoshi appears in Gaim's portion of Kamen Rider x Kamen Rider Gaim & Wizard: The Fateful Sengoku Movie Battle. He is the lord of the Double Army and appears alongside his wife Cha-cha. When Bujin Double is killed by Bujin Gaim and the Nephenthes Inhumanoid (assisted by Armored Rider Zangetsu/Takatora Kureshima who mistakes Bujin Gaim for his world's Gaim), Hideyoshi prepares to fight them himself but Cha-cha gives him an ultimatum: choose her or the war. Hideyoshi chooses her and they retreat. He is portrayed by Minehiro Kinomoto who previously portrayed Ryu Terui/Kamen Rider Accel (who Hideyoshi's personality and mannerisms are similar to) in Kamen Rider W.
Hideyoshi is a playable character in the social romance sim Samurai Love Ballad (天下統一恋の乱 Love Ballad) produced by Voltage (company).
Hideyoshi is a playable character in the visual novel game (purchasable through Apple and Samsung) Ikemen Sengoku; Romances Across Time, produced by Cybird (company)
The protagonist in Nioh 2 and their companion, Tokichiro, are collectively referred to as 'Hideyoshi' after helping Oda Nobunaga with is campaign to unify Japan and is granted the new name in reward for their service. Later Tokichiro becomes corrupted due to Kashin Koji (Õtakemaru) and commits many of his evil crimes due to the possession, including releasing Shuten Dõji and Tamamo no Mae. The player kills Tokichiro which frees him from his possession. He is later revived by Maria at the end of the game and helps the protagonist combat Ōtakemaru. He uses dual swords, along with fire and lightning elements. His guardian spirits are a monkey and a baku (while possessed).

Uesugi Kenshin
Uesugi Kenshin, as Nagao Kagetora, is the main character of the NHK 1969 Taiga drama Ten to Chi to based on the same-titled epic historical novel by Chōgorō Kaionji.
Kenshin, as Nagao Kagetora, is a central character in the 1979 sci-fi film Sengoku Jietai.
Kenshin, played by Eiichi Kanakubo, is a minor character in Akira Kurosawa's 1980 jidaigeki Kagemusha.
Kenshin, as Kagetora, is the main character in the 1990 film Heaven and Earth.
Kenshin is portrayed by Japanese singer-songwriter Gackt in the Japanese taiga drama Fūrin Kazan (2007), as well as in the anime of the gag manga, Tono to Issho (2010).
Kenshin, played by Abe Hiroshi, is a major supporting character in the NHK 2009 Taiga Drama Tenchijin.
Kenshin is featured in Koei's video game series Samurai Warriors and Warriors Orochi. He wields a seven-bladed sword and prays to Bishamonten every time he starts a battle.
In Samurai Warriors, one ending has him allow many warriors to join him. Another ending has him release Takeda Shingen, and they become friends. A third ending has him working with Kunoichi, Takeda Shingen, and Sanada Yukimura in rebuilding Japan after its unification. In SW2, he lets go of Takeda Shingen. In the Warriors Orochi series, he works with the Oda and the Takeda twice to wipe out Orochi. In Dream Mode, he teams with Guan Yu and Xu Huang to rescue Inahime, Tokugawa Ieyasu, and Mori Ranmaru from Sima Yi, the Date, and Taira Kiyomori.
He also features in Koei's Nobunaga's Ambition series of games. He makes another appearance in Kessen III, also by Koei.
Kenshin is also featured in Capcom's Sengoku Basara. In there, she is depicted as female (voiced by Romi Park) with an androgynous figure who would sometimes act rather narcissistic. She is assisted by Kasuga, a fictional Kunoichi who is deeply loyal to her (she may possibly be named after Kasugayama Castle, Kenshin's primary fortress). She also attacks using Iaido and ice-based attacks.
The board game Shogun features Uesugi Kenshin as one of the daimyōs to choose.
In the Super NES video game Inindo: Way of the Ninja, Uesugi Kenshin is Daimyō of the province Echigo.
In the eroge Sengoku Rance, Uesugi Kenshin is the feared and respected female lord commander of the Uesugi House.
A gender-swapped Kenshin appears in Sengoku Otome: Momoiro Paradox.
In the anime Nobunaga the Fool Kenshin is portrayed as a Giant War Armor pilot and leader of the Uesugi Clan
He is a playable character in Pokémon Conquest (Pokémon + Nobunaga's Ambition in Japan), with his partner Pokémon being Gallade.
Kenshin is a playable character in the social romance sim Samurai Love Ballad (天下統一恋の乱 Love Ballad) produced by Voltage (company).
Kenshin is a playable character in the visual novel game (purchasable through Apple and Samsung) Ikemen Sengoku; Romances Across Time, produced by Cybird (company).
In Oda Cinnamon Nobunaga, Kenshin is reincarnated as a Borzoi nicknamed "Julian" in modern-day Japan.
A female version of Kenshin appears in the mobile game Fate/Grand Order under the name Nagao Kagetora.
Another female version of Kenshin as the main protagonist appears in Akiko Higashimura's manga Yukibana no Tora, serialised in Shogakukan's seinen manga magazine Hibana from March 2015 to August 2017.

Yagyū Muneyoshi
The second installment of the Onimusha video game series as well features a swordsman by the name of Yagyū Jūbei, but this is in fact Jūbei's grandfather, Yagyū Muneyoshi. In the fourth game a female Yagyu by the name of Akane took the name of Jūbei as the strongest of her clan and is on a mission to go after Munenori; in this installment, he is represented by the name Sekishūsai Yagyū, one of his famous names.

Yamamoto Kansuke
Yamamoto Kansuke was the subject of the 1969 film Samurai Banners, directed by Hiroshi Inagaki, where the role of Kansuke was played by Toshiro Mifune.
The 2007 NHK Taiga drama Fūrin Kazan (風林火山) features Yamamoto Kansuke as the main character (played by Uchino Masaaki). It is based on the novel by Yasushi Inoue.
Kansuke also appears in the Yoshihiro Takahashi's manga Kacchu no Senshi Gamu.
He is also featured as one of the generals in the strategy game Civilization IV: Warlords.
Kansuke appears as a minor character in the social romance sim Samurai Love Ballad (天下統一恋の乱 Love Ballad) produced by Voltage (company).
A statue of Kansuke appears in a Sony Spider-Man video game.
Yamamoto Kansuke was portrayed by Isao Natsuyagi in the 1990 Japanese movie Heaven and Earth (天と地と, Ten to chi to)

Yasuke 

 In 1968, author Yoshio Kurusu published a children's book, Kurosuke, about Yasuke.
 Yasuke appears in the 2005 to 2017 manga series Hyouge Mono.
 Yasuke is featured in the 2016 to 2020 manga The Man Who Killed Nobunaga.
 Yasuke appears in the 2017 game Nioh, where he is manipulated by Edward Kelley into helping revive Oda Nobunaga, believing the latter can finally grant him the title of samurai. After William defeats him, Yasuke sees the errors of his ways, granting the former a piece of his Guardian Spirit. 
 In the sequel, Nioh 2, Yasuke can be optionally fought as a sparring opponent in a match Nobunaga sets up. During the burning of Honnoji Temple, Yasuke is ordered by Nobunaga to not let anyone claim the latter's corpse. He can be found by the protagonist afterwards with Nobunaga's corpse in his possession. 
 A character named Yasuke appears in the time-travel manga Nobunaga Concerto.
 Yasuke is the protagonist of the eponymous Netflix ONA series Yasuke, released in 2021.
 Koei Tecmo's 2021 game, Samurai Warriors 5, adds Yasuke as a playable character.
 It has been claimed that the Afro Samurai franchise is based on Yasuke.

References

Cultural depictions of Japanese people